2019 in sports describes the year's events in world sports. The main events were the 2019 Cricket World Cup, the 2019 Rugby World Cup, and the 2019 FIFA Women's World Cup.

Calendar by month

Air sports

Aerobatics 
 July 5 – 13: 2nd FAI World Intermediate Aerobatic Championship in  Břeclav
 Individual Overall:  Igor Chernov
 Team Winner:  Ukraine (Igor Chernov, Timur Fatkullin, Dmitry Pogrebitsky)
July 18 – 28: 10th FAI World Advanced Glider Aerobatic Championships  Deva
 Individual Overall:  Patrycja Pacak
 Team Winner:  Romania
July 18 – 28: 	22nd FAI World Glider Aerobatic Championships  Deva
 Individual Overall:  Ferenc Toth 
 Team Winner:  Germany
July 18 – 28: 11th FAI European Advanced Aerobatic Championships  Torun
 Individual Overall:  Nicolas Durin
 Team Winner:  France
July 18 – 28: 11th FAI European Advanced Aerobatic Championships  Châteauroux
 Individual Mixed Overall:  Louis Vanel
 Individual Women's Overall:  Aude Lemordant
 Individual Men's Overall:  Louis Vanel
 Team Winner:  France

Air racing 
2019 Red Bull Air Race World Championship
 February 8 & 9: Red Bull Air Race #1 in  Abu Dhabi
 Winner:  Yoshihide Muroya (Zivko Edge 540 V3)
 Challenger winner:  Florian Bergér (both)
 June 15 & 16: Red Bull Air Race #2 in  Kazan
 Winner:  Yoshihide Muroya (Zivko Edge 540 V3)
 Challenger winner:  Kenni Chiang (Race 1) /  Florian Bergér (Race 2)
 July 13 & 14: Red Bull Air Race #3 in  Zamárdi
 Winner:  Matt Hall (Zivko Edge 540 V3)
 Challenger winner:  Dario Costa (Race 1) /  Daniel Ryfa (Race 2)
 September 7 & 8: Red Bull Air Race #4 in  Makuhari (final)
 Winner:  Yoshihide Muroya (Zivko Edge 540 V3)
 Challenger races cancelled

Aeromodelling 
 March 17 – 23: 2019 FAI F3P World Championship for Indoor Aerobatic Model Aircraft in  Heraklion
 F3P – (Indoor aerobatics) winner:  Gernot Bruckmann
 Junior F3P – (Indoor aerobatics) winner:  Maxime Schmitt
 F3 – Radio Controlled Flight winner:  Donatas Paužuolis
 Junior F3 – Radio Controlled Flight winner:  Andreas Wildauer
 June 2 – 9: 2019 FAI F1D European Championships for Free Flight Indoor Model Aircraft in  Tachov
 Senior winner:  Ivan Tréger
 Junior winner:  Vladyslav Dziubak
 Senior team winner: 
 Junior team winner: 
 October 17 – 22: 2019 FAI F1 World Championships for Free Flight Model Aircraft in  Lost Hills
 F1A Individual:  Constantin Brinzoi
 F1A Individual:  Mickael Rigault
 F1A Individual:  Taron Malkhasyan
 F1A Team: 
 F1A Team: 
 F1A Team: 
 Challenge France:

Ballooning 

 August 27 - September 1: Slovenian Open National Hot Air Balloon Championship 2019 in  Murska Sobota
 Winners: 1st. Dominic Bareford;  2nd. John Petrehn;  3rd. Matthew Scaife
 September 9 – 14: 3rd Central European Cup  Szeged
 Winners: 1st. Daniel Kusternigg;  2nd. Peter Molnar;  3rd. Evgeny Chubarov
 September 9 – 14: 1st Women European Cup  Szeged
 Winners: 1st. Diana Nasonova;  2nd. Tita Becz;  3rd. Inga Ule
 September 12 – 21: 63rd Coupe Aéronautique Gordon Bennett in  Montbéliard
 Winners: 1st. Laurent Sciboz / Nicolas Tieche;  2nd. Kurt Frieden / Pascal Witpraechtiger;  3rd. Vincent Leys / Christophe Houver
 October 20 – 27: 21st FAI European Hot Air Balloon Championship in  Mallorca
 Winners: 1st.  Stefan Zeberli  2nd.  Laurynas Komža 3rd. Nicolas Schwartz

Drone racing 
FAI World Drone Masters 
 November 1 & 3: Jeonju FAI World Drone Masters (WCM #1) in  Jeonju
Winners: 1st.  MinChan Kim, 2nd.  JaeJong Kim, 3rd.  ChangHyeon Kang
2019 FAI Drone Racing World Cup
 March 12: Race Of Drones Oulu (WCC #1) in  Oulu
 Winners: 1st.  Tomass Pētersons, 2nd.  Even Braaten, 3rd.  Glen Bales
 Winners: 1st.  Jakub Toman, 2nd.  David Svoboda, 3rd.  Aleksandar Stojanovic
 May 31 – June 2: World Cup Drones FAI F9U El Yelmo (WCC #3) in  El Yelmo
 Winners: 1st.  Killian Rousseau, 2nd.  Roberto Gomez Samaniego, 3rd.  Kirill Fedukovich
 June 1 & 2: Seoul Drone Race World Cup (WCC #4) in  Seoul
 Winners: 1st.  Beom Jin Choi, 2nd.  Min Chan Kim, 3rd.  Young Rok Son
 June 15 & 16: World Cup Latvia Drone Racing (WCC #5) in  Cēsis
 Winners: 1st.  Tomass Pētersons, 2nd.  Oskars Raudins, 3rd.  David Spacek
 July 6 & 7: Partouche Drone Race World Cup (WCC #6) in  Forges-les-Eaux
 Winners: 1st.  Killian Rousseau, 2nd.  Pawel Laszczak, 3rd.  Fabien Collobert
 July 13 & 14: German Drone World Cup (WCC #7) in  Nördlingen
 Winners: 1st.  Sungju Park, 2nd.  Sven Keim, 3rd.  Bastian Hackl
 July 20 & 21: Belgium FAI Drone Racing World Cup (WCC #8) in  Gouy-lez-Piéton
 Winners: 1st.  Killian Rouseau, 2nd.  Victor Van Der Elst, 3rd.  JoonWeon Choi
 August 10 & 11: Belarus Drone Racing World Cup (WCC #9) in  Minsk
Winners: 1st.  Tomass Pētersons, 2nd.  Arminas Volskis, 3rd.  JoonWeon Choi
 August 17 & 18: Moscow Cup (WCC #10) in  Moscow
Winners: 1st.  Seojun Kim, 2nd.  Vitaly Palianski, 3rd.  SiYun Kim
 August 17 & 18: German Drone Championship (WCC #11) in  Crailsheim
Winners: 1st.  Nick Nolte, 2nd.  Lukas Lendvorsky, 3rd.  Sven-Kevin Keim
 August 24 & 25: UK Drone Racing Open International (WCC #12) in  Barkston Heath
Winners: 1st.  Brett Collis, 2nd.  Luke Wolferstan-Bannister, 3rd.  Alfie Mitchell
 September 7 & 8: F9U World Cup Italy (WCC #13) in  Modena
Winners: 1st.  Sven-Kevin Keim, 2nd.  Emanuele Tomasello, 3rd.  Luisa Rizzo
 September 13 – 15: EPFL Drone Racing Cup (WCC #14) in  Lausanne
Winners: 1st.  Pawel Laszczak, 2nd.  Tristan Goin, 3rd.  Nikolas Widell
 September 14 & 15: Mazovia Drone Racing (WCC #15) in  Warsaw
 Winners: 1st.  Tomass Pētersons, 2nd.  Michał Mrówczyński, 3rd.  Modest Ach
 September 14 & 15: Pam Cup (WCC #16) in  Plovdiv
Winners: 1st.  Bojan Nikov, 2nd.  Aleksandar Nikov, 3rd.  Zlatko D. Radev
 September 21 & 22: Daegu Drone Race World Cup (WCC #17) in  Daegu
Winners: 1st.  MinChan Kim, 2nd.  Michał Mrówczyński, 3rd.  Modest Ach
 September 21 & 22: Lithuania Drone Racing World Cup (WCC #18) in  Vilnius
Winners: 1st.  Karlis Gross, 2nd.  Aleksis Arbergs, 3rd.  Aleksi Rastas
 October 12 & 13: Phoenix Drone Racing (WCC #19) in  Prilep
Winners: 1st.  David Spacek, 2nd.  Michael Husarik, 3rd.  Antoni Georgiev
 October 25 & 27: Drone World Cup Carrefour Montequinto (WCC #20) in  Seville
Winners: 1st.  Michael Husarik, 2nd.  Christian Gavilán Gómez, 3rd.  Aleksi Rastas
 November 1 & 2: Drone Tokyo 2019 Racing & Conference (WCC #21) in  Tokyo
Winners: 1st.  Takafumi Oka, 2nd.  Kazuki Kawada, 3rd.  Fuga Kamizeki
 November 16 & 17: FAI Hong Kong Open Drone Racing Championship (World Cup) (WCC #21) in  Hong Kong
Winners: 1st.  SungJu Park, 2nd.  Chow Ronnie, 3rd.  Ken Inoue
 December 7 & 8: TIRT Drone Racing World Cup (WCC #22) in  Taoyuan
Winners: 1st.  SungJu Park, 2nd.  Ken Inoue, 3rd.  Alexander Lea

General aviation 
 June 10 – 16: 24th FAI World Precision Flying Championship in  Castellón de la Plana
 Individual Winner:  Michal Wieczorek
 Navigation Trophy:  Michal Wieczorek
 Landing:  Jerzy Markiewicz
 Team:  Polonia
 Team Landing:  Polonia
 Woman Best Pilot:  Adele Schramm
 September 8 – 13: 2nd FAI World Air Navigation Race Championship in  Santa Cruz
 Winners: 1st.  Boleslaw Radomski & Dariusz Lechowski, 2nd.  Yuri Rabassa & Mauro Esteve, 3rd.  Adele Schramm & Alexis Fuchs

Gliding 
FAI WORLD AND CONTINENTAL CHAMPIONSHIPS (CAT.1)
 May 11 – 25: 20th FAI European Gliding Championships in  Turbia
 Open Class: 1st.  Petr Tichý, 2nd.  Riccardo Brigliadori, 3rd.  Markus Frank
 18m Class: 1st.  Sebastian Kawa, 2nd.  Karol Staryszak, 3rd.  Wolfgang Janowitsch
 20m Multi-Seat Class: 1st.  Tomasz Rubaj & Christoph Matkowski, 2nd.  Steve Jones & Garry Coppin, 3rd.  Uli Gmelin & Christine Grote
 Team Cup: 1st. , 2nd. , 3rd. 
 June 1 – 8: 9th FAI World Sailplane Grand Prix Championship in  Cerdanya
 1st:  Tilo Holighaus; 2nd:  Sebastian Kawa; 3rd:  Louis Bouderlique
 July 6 – 21: 	20th FAI European Gliding Championships in  Prievidza
 Club:  Tom Arscott
 Standard:  Pavel Louzecky
 15 metre:  Sebastian Kawa
 Team Cup:  Germany
 July 28 – 10: 11th FAI Junior World Gliding Championships in  Szeged
 Club:  Jake Brattle
 Standard:  Simon Schröder
 Team Cup:  Deutscher Aero Club
 July 28 – 10: 3rd FAI Pan-American Gliding Championship in   Rockton, Ontario
 15 Meter /Standard:  Luke Szczepaniak
 18 Meter:  Jerzy Szemplinski
 Club:  Carlos Iucci
 Team Cup:  Argentina
 September 1 – 14: 3rd FAI World 13.5m Class Gliding Championship in  Pavullo nel Frignano
 Meter 13 5:  Thomas Gostner
 e-Glide:  Luka Znidarsic

Parachuting 

 February 27 – March 2: 17th FAI World Para-Ski Championships in  Vrchlabi
 April 17 – 20: 3rd FAI World Indoor Skydiving Championships in  Lille
 May 18 – 15: 14th FAI World Cup of Freefall Style and Accuracy Landing in  Córdoba
 August 12 – 15: 4th FAI World Cup of Speed Skydiving & 3rd FAI European Speed Skydiving Championship in  Dunkeswell
 Men's winner:  Luc Maisin
 Women's winner:  Lucy Lippold
 Team winner:  Germany
 August 17 – 20: 10th FAI World Cup of Canopy Formation & 8th FAI European Canopy Formation Championships in  Strejnic
 Canopy Formation 2-way sequential winners:  France A
 Canopy Formation 4-way sequential winners:  Russia 4W
 August 23 – 30: 1st FAI European Wingsuit Flying Championship & 3rd FAI World Cup of Wingsuit Flying in  Ravenna
 Wingsuit acrobatic flying winner:  Switzerland
 Wingsuit performance flying winner:  Dmitry Podoryashy 
 October 7 – 12: 13th FAI World Cup of Artistic Events & 22nd FAI World Cup of Formation Skydiving in  Eloy
 October 18 – 29: 43rd CISM World Military Parachuting Championship in  Wuhan City
 November 20 – 24: 10th FAI World Cup of Canopy Piloting in  Pretoria

Paragliding 
World Championships
 September 8 – 18: 10th FAI World Paragliding Accuracy Championship in  Vršac
 Men's winner:  Yong Wu
 Women's winner:  Soyoung Cho
 Team winner:  Indonesia
 
2019-20 Paragliding World Cup
 May 25 – June 1: 2019 World Cup France (WC #1) in  Chamousset
 Men's winner:  Charles Cazaux
 Women's winner:  Méryl Delferriere
 Teams winner: / Ozone
 Nations winner:  France
 June 8 – 15: 2019 World Cup China (WC #2) in  Linzhou
 Men's winner:  Baptiste Lambert
 Women's winner:  Méryl Delferriere
 Team's winner: // Gin Gliders
 Nation's winner:  France 
 June 29 – July 6: 2019 World Cup Portugal (WC #3) in  Manteigas
 Men's winner:  Honorin Hamard
 Women's winner:  Constance Mettetal
 Team's winner: // Ozone
 Nation's winner:  France
 September 7 – 14: 2019 World Cup Brazil (WC #4) in  Pico do Gavião
 Men's winner:  Baptiste Lambert
 Women's winner:  Marcella Pomarico Uchoa
 Team's winner: // Kortel Design
 Nation's winner:  Brazil
 November 9 – 16: 2019 World Cup Argentina (WC #5) in  Loma Bola
 Men's winner:  Jurij Vidic
 Women's winner:  Adel Honti
 Team's winner: // Gin Gilders
 Nation's winner:  France
 March 24 – April 4, 2020: 2019 World Cup Superfinal in  Castelo

Para-Ski 
2019 Para-Ski World Cup
 January 25 – 27: WC #1 in  Disentis
 Winners:  Sebastian Graser (m) /  Magdalena Schwertl (f)
 Juniors winner:  Sebastian Graser
 Masters winner:  Reinhold Haibel
 Teams winners:  HSV Red Bull Salzburg 1 (Sebastian Graser, Manuel Sulzbacher, Anton Gruber, Magdalena Schwertl)
 Ski winners:  Sebastian Graser (m) /  Magdalena Schwertl (f)
 February 8 – 10: WC #2 in  Ponte di Legno
 Winners:  Marco Valente (m) /  Magdalena Schwertl (f)
 Juniors winner:  Manuel Sulzbacher
 Masters winner:  Marco Valente
 Teams winners:  HSV Red Bull Salzburg 1 (Sebastian Graser, Manuel Sulzbacher, Anton Gruber, Magdalena Schwertl)
 Ski winners:  Sebastian Graser (m) /  Magdalena Schwertl (f)
 Accuracy winners:  Alic Gernot (m) /  Magdalena Schwertl (f)
 February 15 – 17: WC #3 in  Bad Leonfelden
 Winners:  Sebastian Graser (m) /  Magdalena Schwertl (f)
 Juniors winner:  Sebastian Graser
 Masters winner:  Reinhold Haibel
 Teams winners:  HSV Red Bull Salzburg 1 (Sebastian Graser, Manuel Sulzbacher, Julia Schosser, Magdalena Schwertl)
 Ski winners:  Sebastian Graser (m) /  Magdalena Schwertl (f)
 February 27 – March 2: 17th FAI World Para-Ski Championships in  Vrchlabí (part of World Cup)
 Winners:  Sebastian Graser (m) /  Magdalena Schwertl (f)
 Juniors Mixed winner:  Sebastian Graser
 Masters Mixed winner:  Thomas Saurer
 Women's Para-Ski Teams winner: 
 Mixed Para-Ski Teams winner:

Alpine skiing

American football

 Super Bowl LIII – the New England Patriots (AFC) won 13–3 over the Los Angeles Rams (NFC)
Location: Mercedes-Benz Stadium
Attendance: 70,081
MVP: Julian Edelman, WR (New England)

Aquatics

Archery

2018–19 Indoor Archery World Series
 Note: This is the inaugural set of indoor archery events that replaced the World Cup.
 November 23 – 25, 2018: 2018 GT Open in  Strassen
 Recurve winners:  Steve Wijler (m) /  Casey Kaufhold (f)
 Compound winners:  Domagoj Buden (m) /  Toja Ellison (f)
 December 1 & 2, 2018: 2018 Macau Indoor Archery Open in 
 Recurve winners:  Oh Jin-hyek (m) /  JEON Hun-young (f)
 Compound winners:  Mike Schloesser (m) /  Alexis Ruiz (f)
 December 14 – 16, 2018: 2018 Roma Archery Trophy in  Rome
 Recurve winners:  Crispin Duenas (m) /  KIM Su-rin (f)
 Compound winners:  Braden Gellenthien (m) /  Alexis Ruiz (f)
 Junior Recurve winners:  Matteo Canovai (m) /  Olha Shubkina (f)
 Junior Compound winners:  Kalle Numminen (m) /  Faith Miller (f)
 January 18 – 20: 2019 Nîmes Archery Tournament in 
 Recurve winners:  Lee Seung-yun (m) /  KANG Chae-young (f)
 Compound winners:  Braden Gellenthien (m) /  Janine Meissner (f)
 Junior Recurve winners:  Jules Vautrin (m) /  Aiko Rolando (f)
 Junior Compound winners:  Carson Sapp (m) /  Faith Miller (f)
 February 7 – 9: 2019 Vegas Shoot in  Las Vegas
 Recurve winners:  MIN Byeong-yeon (m) /  SIM Ye-ji (f)
 Compound winners:  Stephan Hansen (m) /  SO Chae-won (f)
 February 8: 2019 Indoor Archery World Series Final in  Las Vegas
 Recurve winners:  Steve Wijler (m) /  SIM Ye-ji (f)
 Compound winners:  Kris Schaff (m) /  Viktoria Balzhanova (f)

2019 Archery World Cup & Championship events
 April 22 – 28: WA World Cup #1 in  Medellin
 Recurve winners:  Brady Ellison (m) /  KANG Chae-young (f)
 Compound winners:  Mike Schloesser (m) /  Sara López (f)
 Team Recurve winners:  (m) /  (f)
 Team Compound winners:  (m) /  (f)
 Mixed winners:  (Recurve) /  (Compound)
 May 6 – 12: WA World Cup #2 in  Shanghai
 Recurve winners:  Lee Woo-seok (m) /  KANG Chae-young (f)
 Compound winners:  Braden Gellenthien (m) /  So Chae-won (f)
 Team Recurve winners:  (m) /  (f)
 Team Compound winners:  (m) /  (f)
 Mixed winners:  (Recurve) /  (Compound)
 May 20 – 26: WA World Cup #3 in  Antalya
 Recurve winners:  Brady Ellison (m) /  ZHENG Yichai (f)
 Compound winners:  James Lutz (m) /  Danelle Wentzel (f)
 Team Recurve winners:  (m) /  (f)
 Team Compound winners:  (m) /  (f)
 Mixed winners:  (Recurve) /  (Compound)
 June 10 – 16: 2019 World Archery Championships in  s-Hertogenbosch
 Recurve winners:  Brady Ellison (m) /  Lei Chien-ying (f)
 Compound winners:  James Lutz (m) /  Natalia Avdeeva (f)
 Team Recurve winners:  (m) /  (f)
 Team Compound winners:  (m) /  (f)
 Mixed winners:  (Recurve) /  (Compound)
 July 1 – 7: WA World Cup #4 in  Berlin
 Recurve winners:  Mete Gazoz (m) /  AN San (f)
 Compound winners:  Evren Çağıran (m) /  Alexis Ruiz (f)
 Team Recurve winners:  (m) /  (f)
 Team Compound winners:  (m) /  (f)
 Mixed winners:  (Recurve) /  (Compound)
 August 19 – 25: 2019 World Youth Archery Championships in  Madrid
 Junior Recurve winners:  KIM Hyeon-jong (m) /  Valentina Acosta Giraldo (f)
 Junior Compound winners:  Anders Faugstad (m) /  Amanda Mlinaric (f)
 Junior Team Recurve winners:  (m) /  (f)
 Junior Team Compound winners:  (m) /  (f)
 Junior Mixed Team winners:  (Recurve) /  (Compound)
 Cadet Recurve winners:  TAI Yu-hsuan (m) /  Komalika Bari (f)
 Cadet Compound winners:  Sebastian Garcia (m) /  Arina Cherkezova (f)
 Cadet Team Recurve winners:  (m) /  (f)
 Cadet Team Compound winners:  (m) /  (f)
 Cadet Mixed Team winners:  (Recurve) /  (Compound) 
 September 2 – 7: 2019 World Archery 3D Championships in  Lac La Biche
 Barebow winners:  David Jackson (m) /  Christine Gauthe (f)
 Compound winners:  Gyorgy Gondan (m) /  Ingrid Ronacher (f)
 Instinctive Bow winners:  Ferenc Molnár (m) /  Karin Novi (f)
 Longbow winners:  Mikhail Poddevalin (m) /  Leena-Kaarina Saviluoto (f)
 Team winners:  (m) /  (f)
 September 6 & 7: WA World Cup #5 (final) in  Moscow
 Recurve winners:  Brady Ellison (m) /  KANG Chae-young (f)
 Compound winners:  Mike Schloesser (m) /  Sara López (f)
 Mixed Team winners:  (Recurve) /  (Compound)

2019 European Archery events
 February 26 – March 2: 2019 European Indoor Archery Championships in  Samsun
 Senior Recurve winners:  Mandia Massimiliano (m) /  Sayana Tsyrempilova (f)
 Senior Compound winners:  Mike Schloesser (m) /  Gizem Elmaagacli (f)
 Junior Recurve winners:  Ivan Kozhokar (m) /  Zhanna Naumova (f)
 Junior Compound winners:  Robin Jaatma (m) /  Elisa Roner (f)
 Senior Team Recurve winners:  (m) /  (f)
 Senior Team Compound winners:  (m) /  (f)
 Junior Team Recurve winners:  (m) /  (f)
 Junior Team Compound winners:  (m) /  (f)
 April 9 – 13: European Grand Prix & Quota Tournament for Minsk European Games in  Bucharest
 Recurve winners:  Steve Wijler (m) /  Karyna Kazlouskaya (f)
 Compound winners:  Valerio della Stua (m) /  Amanda Mlinaric (f)
 QT Recurve winners:  Vladimir Hurban Jr. (m) /  Beatrice Miklos (f)
 QT Compound winners:  Adam Ravenscroft (m) /  Janine Meissner (f)
 Men's Team Recurve winners:  (Sjef van den Berg, Rick van der Ven, & Steve Wijler)
 Women's Team Recurve winners:  (Michelle Kroppen, Elena Richter, & Lisa Unruh)
 Mixed Team Recurve winners:  (Elena Tonetta & Federico Musolesi)
 Men's Team Compound winners:  (Sebastian Hamdorf, Leon Hollas, & Marcel Trachsel)
 Women's Team Compound winners:  (Emily Hõim, Lisell Jäätma, & Meeri-Marita Paas)
 Mixed Team Compound winners:  (Layla Annison & Stuart Taylor)
 CQ Men's Team winners:  (Sjef van den Berg, Rick van der Ven, & Steve Wijler)
 CQ Women's Team winners:  (Randi Degn, Maja Jager, & Anne Marie Laursen)
 April 28 – May 5: Para-Archery European Cup – 1st leg in  Olbia
 For detailed results, click here
 May 13–18: European Youth Cup – 1st leg in  Čatež ob Savi
 For detailed results, click here
 June 23–29: Archery at the 2019 European Games in  Minsk
 Recurve winners:  Mauro Nespoli (m) /  Tatiana Andreoli (f)
 Compound winners:  Mike Schloesser (m) /  Toja Ellison (f)
 Team Recurve winners:  (m) /  (f)
 Mixed winners:  (Recurve) /  (Compound)
 July 6–14: Para-Archery European Cup – 2nd leg in  Nové Město na Moravě
 For detailed results, click here
 July 15–20: European Youth Cup – 2nd leg in  Bucharest
 For detailed results, click here
 September 14–15: European Club Teams Cup in  Čatež ob Savi
 Winners:  Archers de Rennes (m) /  Les Archeres Riomois (f)
 September 30 – October 5: European Archery Field Championships in  Mokrice Castle
 For detailed results, click here

2019 Asian Archery events
 February 13 – 16: IWAS World Games 2019 (Archery) in  Sharjah
 Recurve winners:  Netsiri Manreuchai (m) /  Pooja (f)
 Men's Compound winner:  Lee Ouk Soo
 Men's W1 winner:  Park Hong Jo
 February 22 – 27: 3rd ISSF International Solidarity World Ranking Archery Championships in  Dhaka
 Recurve winners:  Denchai Thepna (m) /  Diya Siddique (f)
 Compound winners:  Chen Chieh-Lun (m) /  . Pragati (f)
 Recurve Teams winners:  (Bishal Changmai, Hooda Paras, Karni Singh Chauhan) (m) /  (Parmida Ghassemi, Shiva Shojamehr, Niloofar Alipour) (f)
 Compound Teams winners:  (Chahal Ritik, Jawkar Prathamesh Samadhan, Vidyarthi Chirag) (m) /  (Shamoli Ray, Susmita Banik, Bonna Akhter) (f)
 Mixed Teams winners:  (Kristina Berger & Marcel Trachsel) (Compound) /  (Hooda Paras & Komalika Bari) (Recurve)
 March 24 – 30: International Archery Tournament “Kuralai” in  Shymkent
 Recurve winners:  Mansur Alimbaev (m) /  Mavzuna Azimova (f)
 Junior Recurve winners:  Andrey Kuzmin (m) /  Anastasia Shapovalova (f)
 Compound winners:  Zhomart Bektursyn (m) /  Zarema Edige (f)
 Recurve Mixed Team winners:  (Zaure Sansyzbay & Mansur Alimbaev)
 Mixed Junior Recurve Team winners:  (Alma Kalibayeva & Daniyar Boztayev)
 Mixed Compound Team winners:  (Aidana Mukhtarhanova & Islam Djanibekov)
 March 24 – 31: 2019 Asia Cup-World Ranking Tournament in  Bangkok
 Recurve winners:  Ilfat Abdullin (m) /  Zheng Yichai (f)
 Compound winners:  Mohammadsaleh Palizban (m) /  Muskan Kirar (f)
 Recurve Team winners:  (Ding Yiliang, Hao Feng, Li Jialun) (m) /  (An Qixuan, Meng Fanxu, Zheng Yichai)
 Compound Team winners:  (. Vikas, Siddhant Gupta, Vedant Wankhade) (m) /  (Nur Aina Yasmine Halim, Fatin Nurfatehah Mat Salleh, Nurul Syazhera Mohd Asmi) (f)
 Recurve Mixed winners:  (Ankita Bhakat & Yashdeep Bhoge)
 Compound Mixed winners:  (Seyedeh-Vida Halimianavval & Mohammadsaleh Palizban)
 April 10 – 16: 5th Fazza Para Archery World Ranking Tournament in  Dubai
 Recurve winners:  Ueyama Tomohiro (m) /  Hazel Chaisty (f)
 Compound winners:  Marcel Pavlik (m) /  Jodi Grinham (f)
 Recurve/Compound W1 winners:  Jean Pierre Antonios (m) /  Shinohara Aya (f)
 Mixed winners:  (Recurve) /  (Compound)
 Mixed Recurve/Compound W1 winners: 
 July 11 – 18: Tokyo 2020 Test Event in  Tokyo
  won both the gold and overall medal tallies.
 July 20 – 21: Interport Indoor Archery Open in 
 Recurve winners:  He Ying (m) /   Almashhadani Fatimah Saad Mahmood (f)
 Compound winners:  Chu Chung Kong (m) /  Poon Yee Tung  (f)
 July 22 – 25: Asian Youth Indoor Archery Open in  Winners:  (Fischer Dylan Wei Ying, Yiu Ngo Him Jasper, Leung Ngo Kiu, Wu Shi Yan)
 August 1 – 7: 2019 Asia Cup – World Ranking Tournament in  Taipei
 For detailed results, click here
 October 17 – 24: 2019 Asian Para Archery Championships in  Bangkok
  won both the gold and overall medal tallies.
 November 22 – 28: 2019 Asian Archery Championships in  Bangkok
  won both the gold and overall medal tallies.

2019 African Archery events
 August 5 – 18: Grand Prix de Côte d'Ivoire in  Abidjan
  won both the gold and overall medal tallies.

Association football

Athletics (track and field)

Badminton

Bandy

Baseball

WBSC
 July 26 – August 4: 2019 U-12 Baseball World Cup in  Tainan
  defeated , 4–0, to win their second U-12 Baseball World Cup title.  took third place.
 August 30 – September 8: 2019 U-18 Baseball World Cup in  Gijang County
 September 18 – 22: Europe/Africa Baseball 2020 Olympic Qualifier in  Bologna & Parma
  has qualified to compete at the 2020 Summer Olympics.

Major League Baseball
 March 20 – September 29: 2019 Major League Baseball season
 American League regular season winners:  Houston Astros
 National League regular season winners:  Los Angeles Dodgers
 June 3–5: 2019 Major League Baseball draft in  Secaucus, New Jersey
 #1 pick:  Adley Rutschman (to the  Baltimore Orioles from the  Oregon State Beavers)
 July 9: 2019 Major League Baseball All-Star Game at Progressive Field in  Cleveland
 The American League defeated the National League, 4–3.
 MVP:  Shane Bieber ( Cleveland Indians)
 2019 Major League Baseball Home Run Derby Winner:  Pete Alonso ( New York Mets)
 October 22 – 30: 2019 World Series
 The  Washington Nationals defeated the  Houston Astros, 4–3 in games played, to win their first World Series title.

2019 Little League Baseball World Series
 July 27 – August 3: 2019 Senior League Baseball World Series in  Easley at Easley Recreation Complex
 Team USA West Region ( Wailuku) defeated Team Caribbean Region ( Willemstad), 11–0, in the final. 
 July 28 – August 4: 2019 Little League Intermediate (50/70) Baseball World Series in  Livermore at Max Baer Park
 Team USA Southeast Region ( McCalla) defeated Team Mexico Region ( Matamoros), 9–5, in the final.
 August 11 – 18: 2019 Junior League Baseball World Series in  Taylor at Heritage Park
 Team USA West Region ( Fullerton) defeated Team Puerto Rico Region ( Guayama), 8–3, in the final.
 August 15 – 25: 2019 Little League World Series in  South Williamsport at both the Little League Volunteer Stadium and the Howard J. Lamade Stadium
 Team USA Southwest Region ( River Ridge) defeated Team Caribbean Region ( Willemstad), 8–0, in the final.

Caribbean Series
 February 4 – 10: 2019 Caribbean Series in  Panama City
  Toros de Herrera defeated  Leñadores de Las Tunas, 3–1, to win their first Caribbean Series title.

Basketball

National Basketball Association
 October 16, 2018 – April 10, 2019: 2018–19 NBA season
 Eastern Conference Winners:  Toronto Raptors
 Western Conference Winners:  Golden State Warriors
 Note: Milwaukee has home court advantage throughout entire playoffs. Golden State has home court advantage throughout conference playoffs.
 February 17: 2019 NBA All-Star Game at the Spectrum Center in  Charlotte, North Carolina
 Team LeBron defeated Team Giannis, with the score of 178–164.
 MVP:  Kevin Durant ( Golden State Warriors)
 NBA All-Star Celebrity Game: Home Team defeated Away Team, with the score of 82–80.
 Rising Stars Challenge: The  team defeated the  World team, with the score of 161–141.
 NBA All-Star Weekend Skills Challenge Winner:  Jayson Tatum ( Boston Celtics)
 Three-Point Contest Winner:  Joe Harris ( Brooklyn Nets)
 Slam Dunk Contest Winner:  Hamidou Diallo ( Oklahoma City Thunder)
 April 13 – June 13: 2019 NBA playoffs
 The  Toronto Raptors defeated the  Golden State Warriors, 4–2 in games played, to win their first NBA title.
 June 20: 2019 NBA draft at the Barclays Center in  Brooklyn
 #1 pick:  Zion Williamson (to the  New Orleans Pelicans from the  Duke Blue Devils)

Women's National Basketball Association
 April 10: 2019 WNBA draft in  New York City at the Nike NYHQ
 #1 pick:  Jackie Young to the  Las Vegas Aces, from the  Notre Dame Fighting Irish team.
 May 24 – September 8: 2019 WNBA season (Regular)
 Eastern Conference RS winners:  Washington Mystics
 Western Conference RS winners:  Los Angeles Sparks
 July 27: 2019 WNBA All-Star Game at Mandalay Bay Events Center in  Las Vegas
 Team Wilson defeated team Delle Donne, with the score of 129–126.
 MVP:  Erica Wheeler ( Indiana Fever)
 Three Point Contest winner:  Shekinna Stricklen ( Connecticut Sun)
 Skills Challenge winner:  Diamond DeShields ( Chicago Sky)
 September 11 – October 10: 2019 WNBA Playoffs
 The  Washington Mystics defeated the  Connecticut Sun, 3–2 in games won, to win their first WNBA title.

National Collegiate Athletic Association
 March 19 – April 8: 2019 NCAA Division I men's basketball tournament
 The  Virginia Cavaliers defeated the  Texas Tech Red Raiders, 85–77 in overtime, to win their first NCAA Division I Men's Basketball title.
 March 22 – April 7: 2019 NCAA Division I women's basketball tournament
 The  Baylor Lady Bears defeated the  Notre Dame Fighting Irish, 82–81, to win their third NCAA Division I Women's Basketball title.

FIBA World Cup Events
 February 15 – 17: 2019 FIBA Intercontinental Cup in  Rio de Janeiro
  AEK Athens defeated  Flamengo, 86–70, to win their first FIBA Intercontinental Cup title.
  San Lorenzo took third place and  Austin Spurs took fourth place.
 June 18 – 23: 2019 FIBA 3x3 World Cup in  Amsterdam
 Men: The  defeated , 18–14, to win their first Men's FIBA 3x3 World Cup title.
  took third place.
 Women:  defeated , 19–13, to win their first Women's FIBA 3x3 World Cup title.
  took third place.
 June 29 – July 7: 2019 FIBA Under-19 Basketball World Cup in  Heraklion
 The  defeated , 93–79, to win their seventh FIBA Under-19 Basketball World Cup title.
  took third place.
 July 20 – 28: 2019 FIBA Under-19 Women's Basketball World Cup in  Bangkok
 The  defeated , 74–70 in overtime, to win their eighth FIBA Under-19 Women's Basketball World Cup title.
  took third place.
 August 31 – September 15: 2019 FIBA Basketball World Cup in 
  defeated , 95–75, to win their second FIBA Basketball World Cup title.
  took third place.  took fourth place.

2019 FIBA 3x3 World Tour
 April 18 & 19: 3x3 WT #1 in  Doha
 Team  Riga Ghetto defeated Team  Liman, 15–14, to win their first World Tour event this year.
 June 1 & 2: 3x3 WT #2 in  Chengdu
 Team  Novi Sad defeated Team  Riga, 21–14, to win their first World Tour event this year.
 July 6 & 7: 3x3 WT #3 in  Mexico City
 Team  Novi Sad defeated Team  NY Harlem, 21–11, to win their second World Tour event this year.
 July 20 & 21: 3x3 WT #4 in  Saskatoon
 Team  Piran defeated Team  Vrbas, 21–14, to win their first World Tour event this year.
 August 3 & 4: 3x3 WT #5 in  Prague
 Team  Riga Ghetto defeated Team  Princeton, 21–12, to win their second World Tour event this year.
 August 23 & 24: 3x3 WT #6 in  Lausanne
 Team  NY Harlem defeated Team  Princeton, 21–15, to win their first World Tour event this year.
 August 27 & 28: 3x3 WT #7 in  Debrecen
 Team  Liman defeated Team  Riga Ghetto, 21–18, to win their first World Tour event this year.
 September 7 & 8: 3x3 WT #8 in  Montreal
 Team  Šakiai Gulbelė defeated Team  Edmonton, 21–14, to win their first World Tour event this year.
 September 21 & 22: 3x3 WT #9 in  Los Angeles
 Team  Princeton defeated Team  Liman, 16–11, to win their first World Tour event this year.
 October 12 & 13: 3x3 WT #10 in  Nanjing
 Team  Edmonton defeated Team  Šakiai Gulbelė, 21–17, to win their first World Tour event this year.
 October 18 & 19: 3x3 WT #11 in  Jeddah
 Team  Riga Ghetto defeated Team  Liman, 21–18, to win their third World Tour event this year.
 November 2 & 3: 3x3 WT #12 (final) in  Utsunomiya
 Team  Novi Sad defeated Team  Princeton, 21–17, to win their third World Tour event this year.

FIBA Europe
National teams
 June 27 – July 7: FIBA Women's EuroBasket 2019 in  & 
  defeated , 88–66, to win their second consecutive and fourth overall FIBA Women's EuroBasket title.
  took third place.  took fourth place.  took fifth place.  took sixth place.
 Note: All teams mentioned above have qualified to compete at the 2020 FIBA World Olympic Qualifying Tournament.
 July 5 – 14: 2019 FIBA U18 Women's European Championship Division B in  Skopje
  defeated , 63–56, to win their first FIBA U18 Women's European Championship Division B title.
  took third place.
 July 6 – 14 2019 FIBA U18 Women's European Championship in  Sarajevo
  defeated , 70–62, to win their second FIBA U18 Women's European Championship title.
  took third place.
 July 12 – 21: 2019 FIBA Europe Under-20 Championship Division B in  Matosinhos
  took third place.
 July 13 – 21: 2019 FIBA Europe Under-20 Championship in  Tel Aviv
  defeated , 92–84, to win their second consecutive FIBA Europe Under-20 Championship title.
  took third place.
 July 14 – 21: 2019 FIBA Europe Under-16 Championship Division C in  Tirana
  defeated , 78–50, to win their second FIBA Europe Under-16 Championship Division C title.
  took third place.Division C
 July 16 – 21: 2019 FIBA Europe Under-16 Championship for Women Division C in  Chișinău
  defeated , 75–38, to win their third FIBA Europe Under-16 Championship for Women Division C title.
  took third place.
 July 26 – August 4: 2019 FIBA Europe Under-18 Championship Division B in  Oradea
  defeated , 81–79, to win their first FIBA Europe Under-18 Championship Division B title.
 The  took third place.
 July 27 – August 4: 2019 FIBA U18 European Championship in  Volos
  defeated , 57–53, to win their fourth FIBA U18 European Championship title.
  took third place.
 July 28 – August 4: 2019 FIBA Europe Under-18 Championship Division C in  Andorra la Vella
  defeated , 67–59, to win their second FIBA Europe Under-18 Championship Division C title.
  took third place.
 July 30 – August 4: 2019 FIBA Europe Under-18 Championship for Women Division C in  Andorra la Vella
  defeated , 79–73, to win their second FIBA Europe Under-18 Championship for Women Division C title.
  took third place.
 August 3 – 11: 2019 FIBA U20 Women's European Championship in  Klatovy
  defeated , 70–67, to win their first FIBA U20 Women's European Championship title.
  took third place.
 August 3 – 11: 2019 FIBA Europe Under-20 Championship for Women Division B in  Prishtina
  defeated , 80–75, to win their first FIBA Europe Under-20 Championship for Women Division B title.
  took third place.
 August 8 – 17: 2019 FIBA Europe Under-16 Championship Division B in  Podgorica
  took third place.
 August 9 – 17: 2019 FIBA U16 European Championship in  Udine
  defeated , 70–61, to win their fifth FIBA Europe Under-16 Championship title.
  took third place.
 August 15 – 24: 2019 FIBA Europe Under-16 Championship for Women Division B in  Sofia
  defeated , 71–56, to win their first IBA Europe Under-16 Championship for Women Division B title.
  took third place.
 August 22 – 30: 2019 FIBA U16 Women's European Championship in  Skopje
  defeated , 73–66, to win their sixth FIBA U16 Women's European Championship title.
  took third place.
 August 30 – September 1: 2019 FIBA 3x3 Europe Cup in  Debrecen
 Men:  defeated , 21–18, to win their second consecutive Men's FIBA 3x3 Europe Cup title.
  took third place.
 Women:  defeated , 14–12, to win their second consecutive Women's FIBA 3x3 Europe Cup title.
  took third place.
 September 6 – 8: 2019 FIBA 3x3 Under-18 Europe Cup in  Tbilisi
 Men:  defeated , 21–14, in the final.  took third place.
 Women:  defeated , 17–16, in the final.  took third place.

Club teams
 September 20, 2018 – May 1: 2018–19 FIBA Europe Cup
  Dinamo Sassari defeated  s.Oliver Würzburg, 170–163 on aggregate, to win their first FIBA Europe Cup title.
 September 20, 2018 – May 5: 2018–19 Basketball Champions League
  Segafredo Virtus Bologna defeated  Iberostar Tenerife, 73–61, to win their first Basketball Champions League title.
  Telenet Antwerp Giants took third place.
 October 3, 2018 – April 15: 2018–19 EuroCup Basketball
  Valencia Basket defeated  Alba Berlin, 2–1 in games played, to win their fourth EuroCup Basketball title.
 October 8, 2018 – April 10: 2018–19 EuroCup Women
  Nadezhda Orenburg defeated  Lattes Montpellier, 146–132 on aggregate, to win their first EuroCup Women title.
 October 9, 2018 – April 14: 2018–19 EuroLeague Women
  UMMC Ekaterinburg defeated fellow Russian team, Dynamo Kursk, 91–67, to win their second consecutive and fifth overall EuroLeague Women title.
  ZVVZ USK Praha took third place.
 October 11, 2018 – May 19: 2018–19 EuroLeague
  CSKA Moscow defeated  Anadolu Efes, 91–83, to win their eighth EuroLeague title.
  Real Madrid took third place.

League events
 September 25, 2018 – April 15: 2018–19 Alpe Adria Cup
  Egis Körmend defeated  Adria Oil Škrljevo, 159–147 on aggregate, to win their first Alpe Adria Cup title.
 September 27, 2018 – March 10: 2018–19 Baltic Women's Basketball League
 In the final,  TTT Riga defeated  Aistes LSU Kaunas, 76–62, to win their 1st Baltic Women's Basketball League.
  Kibirkstis Vilnius took third place and  Tallinn University Women took fourth place.
 September 27, 2018 – April 8: 2018–19 ABA League Second Division
  Sixt Primorska defeated  MZT Skopje Aerodrom, 3–0 in legs played, to win their first ABA League Second Division title.
 September 28, 2018 – April 6: 2018–19 Latvian–Estonian Basketball League (debut event)
  BK Ventspils defeated fellow Latvian team, BK VEF Rīga, 102–80, to win the inaugural Latvian–Estonian Basketball League title.
  BC Kalev took third place.
 September 28, 2018 – April 22: 2018–19 ABA League First Division
  Crvena zvezda mts defeated  Budućnost VOLI, 3–2 in legs played, to win their fourth ABA League First Division title.
 October 3, 2018 – March 17: 2018–19 EWBL
  TTT Riga defeated  Tsmoki-Minsk, 73–63, to win their second EWBL title.
  Rostov-Don took third place.
 October 3, 2018 – March 24: 2018–19 WABA League
  Beroe defeated  Budućnost Bemax, 65–64, to win their first WABA League title.
  Cinkarna Celje took third place.
 October 16, 2018 – April 7: 2018–19 BIBL
  KK Blokotehna defeated  Teuta, 82–68, to win their first BIBL title.
  Academic Bultex 99 took third place.
 November 29, 2018 – April 7: 2018–19 Junior ABA League
  Cibona U19 defeated  Crvena zvezda U19, 73–68, to win their first Junior ABA League title.
  Igokea U19 took third place.

FIBA Americas
National teams
 June 3 – 9: 2019 FIBA Under-16 Americas Championship in  Belém
 The  defeated , 94–77, to win their sixth consecutive FIBA Under-16 Americas Championship title.
 The  took third place.  took fourth place.
 Note: All teams mentioned above have qualified to compete at the 2020 FIBA Under-17 Basketball World Cup.
 June 16 – 22: 2019 FIBA Under-16 Women's Americas Championship in  Puerto Aysén
 The  defeated , 87–37, to win their second consecutive and fifth overall FIBA Under-16 Women's Americas Championship title.
  took third place.  took fourth place.
 Note: All teams mentioned above have qualified to compete at the 2020 FIBA Under-17 Women's Basketball World Cup.
 September 22 – 29: 2019 FIBA Women's AmeriCup in  San Juan
 The  defeated , 67–46, to win their third FIBA Women's AmeriCup title.
  took third place.
 Note: The first eight teams have qualified to compete at the Americas 2020 Olympic pre-qualifying tournaments.

Club teams
 January 18 – March 31: 2019 FIBA Americas League
  San Lorenzo defeated  Guaros, 64–61, to win their second consecutive FIBA Americas League title.

FIBA Asia
National teams

 May 24 – 26: 2019 FIBA 3x3 Asia Cup in  Changsha
 Men:  defeated , 21–9, to win their second consecutive FIBA 3x3 Asia Cup title.
  took third place.
 Women:  defeated , 20–9, to win their second FIBA 3x3 Asia Cup title.
  took third place.
 September 24 – 29: 2019 FIBA Women's Asia Cup in  Bengaluru
  defeated , 71–68, to win their fourth consecutive and fifth overall FIBA Women's Asia Cup title.
  took third place.
 Note: All eight teams in this tournament has qualified to compete at the Asia/Oceania 2020 Olympic pre-qualifying tournaments.
 October 22 – 28: 2019 FIBA Under-16 Women's Asian Championship
 TBA: 2019 FIBA Under-16 Asian Championship

Club teams
 November 16, 2018 – May 15, 2019: 2018–19 ABL season
  BTN CLS Knights Indonesia defeated  Singapore Slingers, 3–2 in a 5-leg final, to win their first ASEAN Basketball League title.
 February 19 – 24: SEABA Club Championship for men and women in  Surabaya
 Men:  West Bandits Jakarta defeated  Mahameru Surabaya, 90–61. 
 Women:  Surabaya Fever defeated  Shoot It Dragons, 68–66.
 September 24 – 29: 2019 FIBA Asia Champions Cup in  Bangkok
  Alvark Tokyo defeated  Al Riyadi Beirut, 98–74, to win their first FIBA Asia Champions Cup title.
  Palayesh Naft Abadan BC took third place.

FIBA Africa
National teams
 July 5 – 14: 2019 FIBA Under-16 African Championship in  Praia
  defeated , 66–57, to win their fourth FIBA Under-16 African Championship title.
  took third place.
 Note: Egypt and Mali both qualified to compete at the 2020 FIBA Under-17 Basketball World Cup.
 July 28 – August 3: 2019 FIBA Under-16 Women's African Championship in  Kigali
  defeated , 84–48, to win their sixth FIBA Under-16 Women's African Championship title.
  took third place.
 August 9 – 18: 2019 Women's Afrobasket in  Dakar
  defeated , 60–55, to win their second consecutive and fourth overall Women's Afrobasket title.
  took third place.

Club teams
 February 8 – May 26: 2018–19 Africa Basketball League
  Primeiro de Agosto defeated  AS Salé, 83–71, to win their ninth Africa Basketball League title.
  Smouha SC took third place.
 TBA for November: 2019 FIBA Africa Women's Clubs Champions Cup

FIBA Oceania
 August 19 – 24: 2019 FIBA Oceania Under-17 Championship for Men & Women in / Nouméa
 Men:  defeated , 85–56, to win their sixth consecutive FIBA Oceania Under-17 Championship title.
  took third place.
 Women:  defeated , 88–41, in the final.
  took third place.

Beach soccer

Beach tennis

Beach volleyball

Biathlon

Bobsleigh & Skeleton

Bowling

World events
 March 17 – 24: World Bowling Junior Championships in  Paris (debut event)
 Singles winners:  Ji Geun (m) /  Arianne Tay (f)
 Doubles winners:  (Donghyuk Park & Ji Geun) (m) /  1 (Kamerin Peters & Mabel Cummins)
 Team winners:  1 (Youngseon Jeong, Ji Geun, Donghyuk Park, Soree Hong)
 August 22 – 30: 2019 WTBA World Tenpin Bowling Championships in  Las Vegas
 September 2 – 10: World Senior Championships in  Las Vegas

Asian events
 April 17 – 25: 20th Asian Youth Tenpin Bowling Championships in  Kuching
  won both gold and overall medal tallies.
 July 6 – 12: 20th Asian School Tenpin Bowling Championships in 
  won both gold and overall medal tallies.
 October 20 – 30: 25th Asian Tenpin Bowling Championships in 
 November 12 – 20: 33rd Asian Intercity Bowling Championships in  Ho Chi Minh City

PBA
2019 PBA Tour season
 February 5 – 9: PBA Tournament of Champions in  Fairlawn
 Winner:  Jason Belmonte (10th major)
 February 12 – 16: PBA Players Championship in  Columbus
 Winner:  Anthony Simonsen (6th major)
 March 12 – 21: PBA World Championship in  Allen Park
 Winner:  Jason Belmonte (11th major)
 March 26 – 31: USBC Masters in  Las Vegas
 Winner:  Jakob Butturff (1st major)
 October 23 – 29: U.S. Open in  Mooresville

PWBA
 May 15 – 21: USBC Queens in  Wichita
 Winner:  Dasha Kovalova (1st major)
 June 16 – 23: U.S. Women's Open in  Las Vegas
 Winner:  Danielle McEwan (2nd major)
 August 21 – 24: PWBA Players Championship in  Raleigh
 September 15 – 18: PWBA Tour Championship in  Richmond

Bowls

World Bowls Tour
 November 3 – 10, 2018: The Scottish International Open 2018 in  Perth
 In the final,  Paul Foster defeated  Stewart Anderson, 6,8–4,12.

World and International Championships
 January 4 – 15: 2019 International Deaf Bowlers Championship in  Christchurch
 Final Positions: 1st. , 2nd. , 3rd. , 4th. , 5th. , 6th. 
 January 10 – 27: 2019 World Indoor Bowls Championship in  Hopton-on-Sea
 Open Singles: 	 Stewart Anderson
 Women's Singles: 	 Julie Forrest
 Open Pairs: 	         Paul Foster & Alex Marshall
 Mixed Pairs:	         Robert Paxton & Ellen Falkner
 Open Under-25: 	 John Orr
 March 5 – 13: 2019 World Cup Singles in  Shellharbour
 Winners:  Gary Kelly (m) /  Jo Edwards (f)
 2nd place:  Brendan Aquilina (m) /  Lucy Beere (f)
 3rd place:  Jeremy Henry &  John Fleming (m) /  Siti Zalina Ahmad &  Rebecca Van Asch
 June 18 – 28: 2019 Asia Pacific Bowls Championships in  Gold Coast
 Singles winners:  Shannon McIlroy (m) /  Jo Edwards (f)
 Pairs winners:  (m) /  (f)
 Triples winners:  (m) /  (f)
 Fours winners:  (m) /  (f)
 October 28 – November 3: 2019 World Singles Champion of Champions in  Adelaide

Boxing

Canadian football
November 24 – 107th Grey Cup: Winnipeg Blue Bombers defeat Hamilton Tiger-Cats, 33–12.

Canoeing

Chess

FIDE Grand Prix 2019
 May 17 – 29: GP #1 in  Moscow Winner:  Ian Nepomniachtchi
 July 11 – 17: GP #2 in  Riga Winner:  Shakhriyar Mamedyarov
 November 4 – 18: GP #3 in  Hamburg Winner:  Alexander Grischuk
 December 10 – 24: GP #4 in  Jerusalem (final) Winner:  Ian Nepomniachtchi

FIDE Women's Grand Prix 2019-20
 September 10 – 23: WGP #1 in  Krasnodar Winner:  Humpy Koneru
 December 2 – 15: WGP #2 in  Winners:  Humpy Koneru,  Alexandra Kosteniuk,  Aleksandra Goryachkina
 March 1–14: WGP #3 in  Lausanne Winners:  Nana Dzagnidze,  Aleksandra Goryachkina
 May 2–15: WGP #4 in  Sardinia Postponed due to the COVID-19 pandemic

World Events
 February 1 – August 1: 7th FIDE World Cup in Composing
 March 4 – 15: 2019 World Team Chess Championship in  Astana
 Winners:  (Sergey Karjakin, Alexander Grischuk, Dmitry Andreikin, Vladislav Artemiev) (m) /  (Tan Zhongyi, Huang Qian, Lei Tingjie, Ding Yixin) (f)
 April 15 – 25: World Senior Team Championships 50+ & 65+ in  Rhodes
 Winners:  (Alexander Shabalov, Joel Benjamin, Igor Novikov, Jaan Ehlvest, Alex Yermolinsky (50+) /  (Evgeny Sveshnikov, Yuri Balashov, Nukhim Rashkovsky, Vladimir V. Zhelnin, Nikolai Pushkov) (65+)
 April 17 – 27: World School Individual Championships in  Antalya
 U7 winners:  Dolas Aarush (b) /  Amanzhol Khanzada (g)
 U9 winners:  Begmuratov Khumoyun (b) /  Kaliakhmet Elnaz (g)
 U11 winners:  Silich Yahor (b) /  Enkhrii Enkh-Amgalan (g)
 U13 winners:  Camlar Arda (b) /  Bayasgalan Khishigbaatar (g)
 U15 winners:  Sindarov Javokhir (b) /  Nurgali Nazerke (g)
 U17 winners:  Yakubboev Nodirbek (b) /  Ulziikhishigjargal Ochirkhuyag (g)
 May 29 – June 19: Women's Candidates Tournament in  Kazan
 Winners: 1st.  Aleksandra Goryachkina, 2nd.  Anna Muzychuk, 3rd.  Kateryna Lagno
 June 29 – July 7: World Amateur Championship in  Mexico City
 U1700 winners:  Jose Gua Cordova Valdivia (m) /  Kseniya Meremyanina
 U2000 winner:  Islam Baisynov
 U2300 winner:  Elias Renzo Gutierrez Medina 
 July 9 – 15: 3rd World Junior Chess Championship for the Disabled 2019 in  Cherry Hill
 Winners: 1st  Ilia Liplin, 2nd.  Samarth Jagadish Rao, 3rd.  Maksim Petrov
 August 15 – 19: World Cadet U8, U10, U12 Rapid & Blitz Chess Championships in  Minsk
 August 20 – September 2: World Cadet U8, 10, 12 Chess Championship in  Weifang
 September 9 – October 2: World Cup 2019 in  Khanti-Mansiysk
 September 10 – 14: World Youth U14, U16, U18 Rapid & Blitz Chess Championships in  Salobrena
 October 1 – 13: World Youth U14, 16, 18 Chess Championship in  Mumbai
 October 14 – 26: World Junior and Girls U20 Chess Championship in  New Delhi
 October 28 – November 6: World Youth U-16 Chess Olympiad in  Çorum
 November 11 – 24: World Senior Championship in  Bucharest
 November 26 – December 4: 1st FIDE World Disabled Cadet and Youth Chess Championships 2019 in  Cardiff (debut event)

Cricket

Twenty20 International
 January 20 – 24: 2019 ACC Western Region T20 in 
 In the final,  defeated , 163/2 (15.3 overs)–157/6 (20 overs).
 Saudi Arabia won by 8 wickets.
 February 9 – 17: 2018–19 Oman Quadrangular Series in 
 Round Robin Final Positions: 1st. , 2nd. , 3rd. , 4th. 
 February 18 – 27: 2019 ICC Women's Qualifier Asia in 
 Round Robin Final Clasament: 1st. , 2nd. , 3rd. , 4th. , 5th. , 6th. , 7th. 
 March 18 – 25: 2018–19 ICC World Twenty20 East Asia-Pacific Qualifier § Regional Finals in 
 Round Robin Final Positions: 1st. , 2nd. , 3rd. 
 May 5 – 12: 2019 ICC Women's Qualifier Africa in 
 In the final,  defeated , 114/5 (20 overs)-64/9 (20 overs).
 Zimbabwe won by 50 runs.
 May 6 – 12: 2019 ICC Women's Qualifier EAP in 
 Round Robin Final Positions: 1st. , 2nd. , 3rd. , 4th. , 5th. , 6th. 
 May 17 – 19: 2019 ICC Women's Qualifier Americas in the 
  defeated  3–0 in the three-match series that formed the Qualifier.
 May 17 – 26: 2018–19 ICC World Twenty20 Africa Qualifier § Regional Finals in 
 Round Robin Final Positions: 1st. , 2nd. , 3rd. , 4th. , 5th. , 6th. 
 June 13 – 21: 2018–19 ICC World Twenty20 Europe Qualifier § Regional Finals in 
 Round Robin Final Positions: 1st. , 2nd. , 3rd. , 4th. , 5th. , 6th. 
 June 24 – 30: 2019 ICC Women's Qualifier Europe in 
 Round Robin Final Positions: 1st. , 2nd. , 3rd. 
 July 22 – July 28: 2018–19 ICC World Twenty20 Asia Qualifier § Regional Finals in 
 Round Robin Final Positions: 1st. , 2nd. , 3rd. , 4th. , 5th. 
 August 15 – 25: 2018–19 ICC World Twenty20 Americas Qualifier § Regional Finals in 
 Round Robin Final Positions: 1st. , 2nd. , 3rd. , 4th. 

List A
 April 18 – 28: 2019 ICC World Cricket League Division Two in 
 Final Positions: 1st. , 2nd. , 3rd. , 4th. , 5th. , 6th. 

One Day International
 May 5 – 17: 2019 Ireland Tri-Nation Series in 
 In the final,  defeated , 213/5 (22.5 overs)-152/1 (24 overs)
 Bangladesh won by 5 wickets (DLS method) 
 In the Super Over, England scored 15/0 and New Zealand scored 15/1. England won on boundaries (26–17).

Test cricket
 August 1 – September 16: 2019 Ashes series in

Cross-country skiing

Cue sports

Curling

Cycle sport

Dancesport

Grand Slam
 March 16 & 17: GS #1 in  Bucharest
 Adult Latin winners:  Armen Tsaturyan & Svetlana Gudyno
 Adult Standard winners:  Evaldas Sodeika & Ieva Žukauskaitė
 June 1 & 2: GS #2 in  Taipei
 Adult Latin winners:  Armen Tsaturyan & Svetlana Gudyno
 Adult Standard winners:  Evaldas Sodeika & Ieva Žukauskaitė
 July 13 & 14: GS #3 in  Rimini
 Adult Latin winners:  Armen Tsaturyan & Svetlana Gudyno
 Adult Standard winners:  Evaldas Sodeika & Ieva Žukauskaitė
 August 15 & 16: GS #4 in  Stuttgart
 October 25 & 26: GS #5 in  Moscow Region
 December 7 & 8: GS #6 in  Shanghai (final)

Grand Prix
 March 10: WDSF PD Super Grand Prix in  Tokyo
 Adult Standard winners:  Nikolay Darin & Natalia Seredina
 March 23 & 24: WDSF PD Super Grand Prix in  Pieve di Cento
 Adult Latin winners:  Gabriele Goffredo & Anna Matus
 Adult Standard winners:  Bjorn Bitsch & Ashli Williamson

World Open
 January 12 & 13: WO #1 in  Benidorm
 Adult Latin winners:  Andrea Silvestri & Martina Varadi
 Adult Standard winners:  Evaldas Sodeika & Ieva Žukauskaitė
 January 19: WO #2 in  Montecatini Terme
 Adult Standard winners:  Evaldas Sodeika & Ieva Žukauskaitė
 January 26: WO #3 in  Pforzheim
 Adult Latin winners:  Marius-Andrei Balan & Kristina Moshenska
 February 9 & 10: WO #4 in  Antwerp
 Adult Latin winners:  Anton Aldaev & Natalia Polukhina
 Adult Standard winners:  Evgeny Nikitin & Anastasia Miliutina
 February 23: WO #5 in  Lisbon
 Adult Latin winners:  Konstantin Gorodilov & Dominika Bergmannova
 March 9: WO #6 in  Brno
 Adult Standard winners:  David Odstrčil & Tara Bohak
 March 9 & 10: WO #7 in  Kyiv
 Adult Latin winners:  Marius-Andrei Balan & Kristina Moshenska
 Adult Standard winners:  Madis Abel & Aleksandra Galkina
 March 10: WO #8 in  Tokyo
 Adult Standard winners:  Francesco Galuppo & Debora Pacini
 March 23 & 24: WO #9 in  Pieve di Cento
 Adult Latin winners:  Armen Tsaturyan & Svetlana Gudyno
 Adult Standard winners:  Francesco Galuppo & Debora Pacini
 March 30: WO #10 in  Skopje
 Adult Latin winners:  Giacomo Lazzarini & Michelle Nazarenus
 Adult Standard winners:  Vadim Shurin & Anastasia Meshkova
 April 6 & 7: WO #11 in  Moscow
 Adult Latin winners:  Armen Tsaturyan & Svetlana Gudyno
 Adult Standard winners:  Evgeny Moshenin & Dana Spitsyna
 April 13 & 14: WO #12 in  Paphos
 Adult Latin winners:  Giacomo Lazzarini & Michelle Nazarenus
 Adult Standard winners:  Daniil Ulanov & Kateryna Isakovych
 April 19: WO #13 in  Berlin
 Adult Standard winners:  Madis Abel & Aleksandra Galkina
 April 20 & 21: WO #14 in  Cambrils
 Adult Latin winners:  Timur Imametdinov & Nina Bezzubova
 Adult Standard winners:  Edgars Linis & Eliza Ancane
 May 4 & 5: WO #15 in  Copenhagen
 Adult Latin winners:  Konstantin Gorodilov & Dominika Bergmannova
 Adult Standard winners:  Dmitri Kolobov & Signe Busk
 May 5: WO #16 in  Shijiazhuang
 Adult Latin winners:  Armen Tsaturyan & Svetlana Gudyno
 Adult Standard winners:  Evaldas Sodeika & Ieva Zukauskaite
 May 18: WO #17 in  Yerevan
 Adult Latin winners:  Armen Tsaturyan & Svetlana Gudyno
 May 25: WO #18 in  Paris
 Adult Standard winners:  Madis Abel & Aleksandra Galkina
 June 1: WO #19 in  Szombathely
 Adult Latin winners:  Miculescu Ionut Alexandru & Pacurar Andra
 June 15: WO #20 in  Vila do Conde
 Adult Latin winners:  Semen Khrzhanovskiy & Elizaveta Lykhina
 June 15 & 16: WO #21 in  Tirana
 Adult Latin winners:  Miculescu Ionut Alexandru & Pacurar Andra
 Adult Standard winners:  Matteo Cicchitti & Simona Brecikova
 June 27 – 29: WO #22 in  Sochi
 Adult Latin winners:  Armen Tsaturyan & Svetlana Gudyno
 Adult Standard winners:  Evgeny Moshenin & Dana Spitsyna
 July 6 & 7: WO #23 in  Wuppertal
 Adult Latin winners:  Marius-Andrei Balan & Khrystyna Moshenska
 Adult Standard winners:  Madis Abel & Aleksandra Galkina
 July 21: WO #24 in  Dalian
 Adult Latin winners:  Armen Tsaturyan & Svetlana Gudyno
 Adult Standard winners:  Francesco Galuppo & Debora Pacini
 August 30 & 31: WO #25 in  Bangkok
 September 14 & 15: WO #26 in  Prague
 September 21 & 22: WO #27 in  Bratislava
 October 5: WO #28 in  Ostrava
 October 12 & 13: WO #29 in  Elblag
 October 19 & 20: WO #30 in  Amsterdam
 October 19 & 20: WO #31 in  Kyiv
 November 2 & 3: WO #32 in  Sibiu
 November 9 & 10: WO #33 in  Warsaw
 November 23: WO #34 in  Tallinn
 November 30: WO #35 in  Vilnius
 November 30 & December 1: WO #36 in  Maribor
 December 14 & 15: WO #37 in  Paphos
 December 14 & 15: WO #38 in  Riga (final)

International competitions
 February 8: WDSF World Championship (Senior IV Standard) in  Antwerp
 1st place:  Luciano Ceruti & Rosa Nuccia Cappello
 2nd place:  Renato Sibillo & Anna Cartini
 3rd place:  Vittorio Guida & Fortuna Canta
 April 20: WDSF World Championship (Senior I Standard) in  Berlin
 1st place:  Dmitry Vorobiev & Oxana Skripnik
 2nd place:  Fabian Wendt & Anne Steinmann
 3rd place:  Corentin Normand & Laura Lozingue
 April 20: WDSF European Championship (Youth Latin) in  Chișinău
 1st place:  Vladislav Untu & Polina Baryshnikova
 2nd place:  German Pugachev & Ariadna Tishova
 3rd place:  Marian Hlavac & Tereza Maturova

Darts

Professional Darts Corporation
 December 13, 2018 – January 1: 2019 PDC World Darts Championship in  London
  Michael van Gerwen defeated  Michael Smith, 7–3
 February 1 – 3: 2019 Masters in  Milton Keynes
  Michael van Gerwen defeated  James Wade, 11–5
  Michael van Gerwen defeated  Rob Cross, 11–5
 March 1 – 3: 2019 UK Open in  Minehead
  Nathan Aspinall defeated  Rob Cross, 11–5
 June 6 – 9: 2019 PDC World Cup of Darts in  Hamburg
  defeated , 3–1
 July 20 – 28: 2019 World Matchplay in  Blackpool
  Rob Cross defeated  Michael Smith, 18–13
 October 6 – 12: 2019 World Grand Prix in  Dublin
  Michael van Gerwen defeated  Dave Chisnall, 5–2
 October 19 – 20 : 2019 Champions League of Darts in  Leicester
  Michael van Gerwen defeated  Peter Wright, 11–10
 October 24 – 27: 2019 European Championship in  Göttingen
  Rob Cross defeated  Gerwyn Price, 11–6
 November 1 – 3: 2019 World Series of Darts Finals in  Amsterdam
  Michael van Gerwen defeated  Danny Noppert, 11–2
 November 9 – 17: 2019 Grand Slam of Darts in  Wolverhampton
  Gerwyn Price defeated  Peter Wright, 16–6
 November 22 – 24: 2019 Players Championship Finals in  Minehead
  Michael van Gerwen defeated  Gerwyn Price, 11–9
 November 24: 2019 PDC World Youth Championship Final in  Minehead
  Luke Humphries defeated  Adam Gawlas, 6–0

British Darts Organisation
 January 5 – 13: 2019 BDO World Darts Championship in  Frimley Green
 Men:  Glen Durrant defeated  Scott Waites, 7–3.
 Women:  Mikuru Suzuki defeated  Lorraine Winstanley, 3–0.
 August 30 – September 1: 2019 World Trophy in  Blackburn
 Men:  Jim Williams defeated  Richard Veenstra, 8–6.
 Women:  Lisa Ashton defeated  Anastasia Dobromyslova, 6–2.
 October 23 – 28: 2019 World Masters in  Purfleet
 Men:  John O'Shea defeated  Scott Waites, 6–4.
 Women:  Lisa Ashton defeated  Anastasia Dobromyslova, 5–4.

Disc golf & Ultimate

Major World events
 May 6 – 11: WFDF 2019 European Beach Ultimate Championships in  Portimão
 ,  and  won 2 gold medals each.  won overall medal tally.
 June 13 – 16: WFDF 2019 Asia Oceanic Beach Ultimate Championships in  Shirahama
 Men's Division winners: 
 Women's Division winners: 
 Mixed Division winners:  
 June 29 – July 6: EUF 2019 European Ultimate Championship in  Győr
 Men winners:  (Championship) /  (Spirit)
 Women winners:  (Championship) /  (Spirit)
 Mixed winners:  (Championship) /  (Spirit)
 June 14 – 17: WFDF 2019 All Africa Ultimate Championships in  Johannesburg
 In the final,  UCT Flying Tigers defeated  Ghost Ultimate, 12–7.
  Catch-22 won the Spirit of the Game.
 July 13 – 20: WFDF 2019 World Under 24 Ultimate Championships in  Heidelberg
 Men's, Women's and Mixed Division winners: 
 July 23 – 27: WFDF 2019 Asia Oceanic Ultimate & Guts Championships in  Shanghai
 Men winners: 
 Women winners: 
 Mixed winners: 
 August 21 – 24: WFDF 2019 World Team Disc Golf Championships in  Ida-Viru
 November 3 – 8: WFDF 2019 Pan American Ultimate Championships in  Sarasota

Disc Golf Pro Tour
 February 28 – March 2: Memorial Championship in  Scottsdale
 Winners:  Eagle Wynne McMahon (m) /  Eveliina Salonen (f)
 March 14 – 17: Waco Annual Charity Open in  Waco
 Winners:  Paul McBeth (m) /  Catrina Allen (f)
 April 12 – 14: Jonesboro Open in  Jonesboro
 Winners:  Paul McBeth (m) /  Page Pierce (f)
 June 21 – 23: Discraft Ledgestone Insurance Open in  Eureka
 Winners:  Paul McBeth (m) /  Page Pierce (f)
 July 26 – 28: Idlewild Open in  Burlington
 August 29 – September 1: MVP Open at Maple Hill in  Leicester

PDGA Major Events
 March 27 – 30: National Collegiate Disc Golf Championship in  Appling
 Individual winners:  Mark Anderson (Missouri S&T) (m) /  Madi Chitwood (Southern Arkansas)
 Team winners:  Ferris State (m) / (Southern Arkansas) (f)
 Individual First Flight winner:  Mitchell Crowley (Wisconsin–Platteville)
 Team First Flight winners:  Liberty University
 Team Second Flight winners:  Ferris State
 April 11 – 14: 2019 PDGA Amateur World Doubles Championships in  Mount Vernon
 Advanced winners:  Jeff Plaisance & Jacob Horning (m) /  Mary Lippa & Amber Horsley (f)
 Amateur Masters 40+ winners:  Kenneth Reagan &  Doug LaRhette
 Amateur Masters 50+ winners:  Trevor Toenjes & Ben Champion
 Amateur Masters 60+ winners:  Fred Needham & Michael England
 Intermediate winners:  Ivan Torres & Salvador Robles
 June 7 – 9: 2019 PDGA United States Amateur Disc Golf Championship in  Milford
 Advanced winner:  Kyle Klein
 June 22 – 29: 2019 PDGA Professional Masters Disc Golf World Championships in  Jeffersonville
 Pro Masters 40+ winners:  David Feldberg (m) /  Elaine King (f)
 Pro Masters 50+ winner:  Ron Convers
 Pro Masters 55+ winners:  Mitch McClellan (m) /  Pam(ouflage) Reineke (f)
 Pro Masters 60+ winners:  David L. Greenwell (m) /  Laurie Cloyes-Chupa (f)
 Pro Masters 65+ winner:  Johnny Sias
 Pro Masters 70+ winner:  Dr. Rick Voakes
 Pro Masters 75+ winner:  Pete May
 Pro Masters 80+ winner:  Carlos Rigby
 July 9 – 13: 2019 PDGA Junior Disc Golf World Championships in  Emporia
 Junior ≤U18 winners:  Zach Arlinghaus (b) /  Melody Castruita (g)
 Junior ≤15 winners:  Gannon Buhr (b) /  Hope C. Brown (g)
 Junior ≤12 winners:  Kolby Sanchez (b) /  Haley Castruita (g)
 Junior ≤10 winners:  Wyatt Mahoney (b) /  Zoey Lynn Martinez (g)
 Junior ≤8 winner:  Kaidin Bell
 July 18 – 21: European Open in  Nokia
 July 20 – 27: 2019 PDGA Amateur Disc Golf World Championships in  York
 August 10 – 17: 2019 PDGA Professional Disc Golf World Championships in  Peoria
 September 5 – 8: 2019 PDGA Tim Selinske US Masters in  Leicester
 September 19 – 22: 2019 United States Women's Disc Golf Championships in  Spotsylvania
 October 2 – 5: United States Disc Golf Championship in  Rock Hill

2019 USA National Tour Events
 February 21 – 24: Las Vegas Challenge in  Henderson
 Winners:  Calvin Heimburg (m) /  Paige Bjerkaas &  Catrina Allen (f)
 April 24 – 27: Dynamic Discs Glass Blown Open in  Emporia
 Winners:  Paul McBeth (m) /  Catrina Allen (f)
 May 17 – 19: Santa Cruz Masters Cup in  Santa Cruz
 Winners:  Garrett Gurthie (m) /  Catrina Allen (f)
 June 7 – 9: Beaver State Fling in  Estacada
 Winners:  Eagle Wynne McMahon (m) /  Paige Pierce (f)
 August 23 – 25: Delaware Disc Golf Challenge in  Newark
 October 11 – 13: The Ed Headrick Disc Golf Hall of Fame Classic in  Appling

2019 European Tour
 April 20 & 21: ET#1 – Dutch Open in  Rijswijk
 Winners:  Stanislaus Amann (m) /  Kristin Tattar (f)
 Pro Masters 40+ winner:  Thomas Rasmussen
 Pro Masters 50+ winner:  Mehdi Boukarabila
 Pro Masters 60+ winner:  Paul Francz
 Advanced winner:  Michael Faber 
 May 3 – 5: ET#2 – Bluebell Woods Open in  Dunbar
 Winners:  Silver Lätt (m) /  Kristin Tattar (f)
 Pro Masters 40+ winners:  Samuel Baumgartner (m) /  Sue Underwood (f)
 Pro Masters 50+ winner:  Mehdi Boukarabila
 Pro Masters 60+ winner:  Marion van Linden
 Advanced winners:  Noah Smithson (m) /  Merete Auestad (f)
 Junior winner:  Andri Fannar Torfason (default)
 May 18 & 19: ET#3 – Kokkedal Open in  Kokkedal
 Winners:  Håkon Kveseth (m) /  Kristin Tattar (f)
 Pro Masters 40+ winners:  Anders Swärd (m) /  Lydie Hellgren (f)
 Pro Masters 50+ winner:  Jean-Louis Tanghe
 Pro Masters 60+ winner:  Paul Kustala
 Advanced winners:  Sebastian Pauli (m) /  Merete Auestad (f) (default)
 Junior winner:  Lea Schadenhofer (default)
 June 7 – 9: ET#4 – Sula Open in  Langevåg
 Winners:  Juhani Vainio (m) /  Kristin Tattar (f)
 Pro Masters 40+ winner:  Bert Brader (m)
 Pro Masters 50+ winner:  Mehdi Boukarabila
 Pro Masters 60+ winner:  Terje Rørmark
 June 15 & 16: ET#5 – Quarry Park Open in  Leamington Spa
 Winners:  Tony Ferro (m) /  Hanna Hugosson (f)
 Pro Master 40+ winner:  Sue Underwood
 Advanced winners:  Arnþór Finnsson (m) /  Kelly Addison (f)
 June 22 – 24: ET#6 – Iceland Summer Solstice in  Garðabær
 Winners:  Blær Örn Ásgeirsson (m) /  Kolbrun Mist Palsdottir (f)
 Pro Master 40+ winner:  Eyþór Örn Eyjólfsson
 Pro Master 60+ winner:  Arni Leosson
 Advanced winners:  Arnþór Finnsson (m) /  Guðrún Fjóla Guðmundsdóttir (f)
 Junior winner:  Andri Fannar Torfason (default)
 July 11 – 13: ET#7 – Estonian Open in  Aegviidu
  Kevin Jones (m) /  Kristin Tattar (f)
 September 6 – 8: ET#8 – Nokia Open in  Nokia
 September 14 & 15: ET#9 – Creeksea Classic in  Burnham-on-Crouch

Equestrianism

Fencing

Field hockey

FIH
 Note: The Pro League replaced both the Men's FIH Hockey World League for Men and the Women's FIH Hockey World League for Women.
 January 19 – June 23: 2019 Men's FIH Pro League
  Australia defeated  Belgium 3–2 in the final to win the first FIH Pro League title.
  The Netherlands took third place.
 January 26 – June 23: 2019 Women's FIH Pro League
  The Netherlands defeated  Australia 4–3 in a shoot-out after the final ended in a 2–2 draw to win the first FIH Pro League title.
  Germany took third place.

EHF
Clubs teams
 October 5, 2018 – 2019: 2018–19 Euro Hockey League
 In the final,  Waterloo Ducks defeated  Rot-Weiss Köln 4–0.  Mannheimer HC took third place and  Real Club de Polo took fourth place.
 June 7 – 10: 2019 Men's EuroHockey Club Trophy in  Wettingen
 In the final,  Cardiff & Met defeated  Stroitel Brest, 4–3.  Rotweiss Wettingen took third place and  OKS Vinnitsa took fourth place.
 February 15 – 17: 2019 Men's EuroHockey Indoor Club Cup in  Vienna
 In the final,  Partille SC defeated  SV Arminen, 3–1.  Uhlenhorster HC took third place and  Dinamo Stroitel Ekaterinburg took fourth place.
 February 8 – 10: EuroHockey Indoor Club Trophy in  Sveti Ivan Zelina
 Round Robin: 1st.  C.H. SPV Complutense, 2nd.  Grunwald Poznań, 3rd.  Gaziantep Polis Gücü SK, 4th.  East Grinstead HC
 February 8 – 10: EuroHockey Indoor Club Challenge I in  Oslo
 Round Robin: 1st.  A.D. Lousada, 2nd.  Three Rock Rovers, 3rd.  Inverleith HC, 4th.  Hockey Team Bologna
 February 8 – 10: EuroHockey Indoor Club Challenge II in  Varna
 Round Robin: 1st.  Soroksári HC, 2nd.  FHC Akademik Plus Sofia, 3rd.  HK Triglav Predanovci, 4th.  HC Kilppari, 5th.  HK Elektrovojvodina, 6th.  Club Adjara
 February 15 – 17: Women's EuroHockey Indoor Club Cup in  Hamburg
 In the final,  LMHC Laren defeated  Dinamo Elektrostal, 3–1.  Der Club an der Alster took third place and  Club de Campo Villa de Madrid took fourth place.
 February 15 – 17: Women's EuroHockey Indoor Club Trophy in  Vienna
 Round Robin: 1st.  SV Arminen, 2nd,  Bowdon Hockey Club, 3rd.  SK Slavia Prague, 4th.  HAHK Mladost
 February 15 – 17: Women's EuroHockey Indoor Club Challenge I in  Douai
 Round Robin: 1st.  Douai HC, 2nd,  Bolu Belediyesi Spor Kulübü, 3rd.  FHC Akademik Plus Sofia, 4th.  Lisbon Casuals HC
 February 16 & 17: Women's EuroHockey Indoor Club Challenge II in  Belgrade
 In the final,  Copenhagen HC defeated  Kutaisi HC, 10–0.  HK Bask took third place and  Porvoo HC took fourth place.
 April 19 – 22: 2019 EuroHockey Club Champions Cup in  Amstelveen
 In the final,  Amsterdam defeated  Real Sociedad, 7–0.  Club an der Alster took third place and  Den Bosch took fourth place.
 April 19 – 22: 2019 Women's EuroHockey Club Trophy in  Rochester
 In the final,  Club de Campo defeated  Holcombe, 3–1.  Waterloo Ducks took third place and  UCD took fourth place.
 April 19 – 22: Women's EuroHockey Club Challenge I in  Lille
 In the final,  Lille MHC defeated  Clydesdale Western, 3–1.  Braxgata HC took third place and  Rotweiss Wettingen took fourth place.
 June 6 – 9: EuroHockey Club Challenge II in  Prague
 In the final,  AD Lousada defeated  Grammarians HC, 2–0.  Slavia Prague took third place and  KPH Rača took fourth place.
 June 6 – 9: EuroHockey Club Challenge IV in  Malta
 In the final,  Kringsja SK defeated  Qormi HC, 3–0 in a shoot-out after the final ended in a 2–2 draw.  Eagles HC took third place and  Építők HC took fourth place.
 June 7 – 10: EuroHockey Club Challenge I in  Siemianowice Śląskie
 In the 1st promotion playoff  HC Bra defeated  Whitchurch HC 6–0.
 In the 2nd promotion playoff,  SG Amsicora ASD defeated  Slagelse HC, 2–1 in a shoot-out after the match ended in a 3–3 draw.
 HC Bra and SG Amsicora ASD were joint winners whilst Whitchurch HC and Slagelse HC were joint 3rd.
 June 7 – 9: EuroHockey Club Challenge III in  Alanya
 In the final,  Copenhagen HC defeated  Zytomyrskyiv, 7–2.  Gaziantep Polisgücü SK took third place and  Soroksári–Olcote HC took fourth place.
 June 7 – 10: Women's EuroHockey Club Challenge II in  Vienna
 In the final,  HF Lorenzoni Bra defeated  Swansea City HC, 2–1.  SG Amsicora ASD took third place and  Zuvedra Tauras took fourth place.
 June 7 – 10: Women's EuroHockey Club Challenge III in  Boryspil
 In the final,  HC 1972 Rakovník defeated  HAHK Mladost, 4–0.  Kolos Boryspol took third place and  HK Zelina took fourth place.

National teams
 January 11 – 13: EuroHockey Indoor Junior Championship in  Vienna
 In the final,  defeated , after penalties, 4–3, original match ended 3–3.  took third place and  took fourth place.
 January 11 – 13: EuroHockey Indoor Junior Championship II in  Paredes
 Round Robin final placement: 1. , 2. , 3. , 4. , 5. , 6. , 7. 
 January 18 – 20: Women's EuroHockey Indoor Junior Championship in  Tarnowskie Góry
 In the final,  defeated , 5–2.  took third place and  took fourth place.
 January 18 – 20: Women's EuroHockey Indoor Junior Championship II in  Sveti Ivan Zelina
 In the final,  defeated , 5–1.  took third place and  took fourth place.
 July 3 – 6: EuroHockey5s U16 Championship for boys and girls in  Wałcz
 In the boys final,  defeated , 4–0.  took third place and  took fourth place.
 In the girls final,  defeated , 3–1.  took third place and  took fourth place.
 July 4 – 6: EuroHockey5s U16 Championship II in  Albena
 In the final,  defeated , 10–1.  took third place and  took fourth place.
 July 13 – 21: Women's EuroHockey Junior Championship in  Valencia
 In the final,  defeated , 4–3 in a shoot-out after the final ended in a 1–1 draw.  took third place and  took fourth place.
 July 14 – 20: EuroHockey Junior Championship II in  Plzeň
 In the final,  defeated , 4–1.  took third place and  took fourth place.
 July 14 – 20: Women's EuroHockey Junior Championship II in  Alanya
 In the final,  defeated , 9–0.  took third place and  took fourth place.
 July 19 – 21: EuroHockey Junior Championship III in  Vilnius
 In the final,  defeated , 4–3.  took third place.
 July 15 – 21: EuroHockey Junior Championship in  Valencia
 In the final,  defeated , 5–3.  took third place and  took fourth place.
 July 28 – August 3: 2019 Men's EuroHockey Championship II in  Cambrai
 In the final,  defeated , 4–0.  took third place and  took fourth place.
 July 28 – August 3: 2019 Men's EuroHockey Championship III in 
 In the final,  defeated , 5–4.  took third place and  took fourth place.
 July 28 – August 3: 2019 Women's EuroHockey Championship III in  Lipovci
 In the final,  defeated , 4–3.  took third place and  took fourth place.
 August 16 – 25: 2019 Men's EuroHockey Nations Championship in  Antwerp
 In the final,  defeated , 5–0.  took third place and  took fourth place.
 August 6 – 11: 2019 Men's EuroHockey Championship IV in  Helsinki
 Round Robin: 1st. , 2nd. , 3rd. , 4th. , 5th. 
 August 16 – 25: 2019 Women's EuroHockey Nations Championship in  Antwerp
 In the final,  defeated , 2–0.  took third place and  took fourth place.
 August 4 – 10: 2019 Women's EuroHockey Championship II in  Glasgow
 In the final,  defeated , 2–1.  took third place and  took fourth place.

Figure skating

Fistball

Continental and World Competitions
 January 11 & 12: EFA 2019 Women's Indoor Champions Cup in  Laakirchen
 In the final,  TSV Dennach defeated  ASKÖ Laakirchen Papier, 4–2 (11–7, 8–11, 11–8, 11–9, 6–11, 11–5).
  TV Eibach 03 Nuremberg took third place and  TSV Jonah took fourth place.
 January 11 & 12: EFA 2019 Men's Indoor Champions Cup 2019 in  Diepoldsau
 In the final,  TSV Pfungstadt defeated  VfK Berlin, 4–0 (11–3, 11–7, 11–6, 11–5).
  Vöcklabruck took third place and  Diepoldsau took fourth place.
 July 2 – 7: CSIT IFA 2019 Fistball Amateurs World Cup in  Tortosa (debut event)
 In the final,  Union Waldburg defeated  Union Peilstein, 3–1 (12–10, 11–6, 7–11, 11–8)
  Faustball Flurlingen took third place.
 July 5 & 6: EFA 2019 Fistball Women's Champions Cup in  Laakirchen
 In the final,  TSV Dennach defeated  Union Nussbach, 3–1 (7–11, 11–3, 11–4, 11–6).
  TSV Jonah took third place and  Ahlhorner SV took fourth place.
 July 6 & 7: EFA 2019 EFA Fistball Men's European Cup in  Kleindöttingen
 In the final,  TSV Calw defeated  Faustall Widnau, 3–2 (8–11, 12–14, 11–7, 11–8, 15–13).
  TV Schweinfurt-Oberndorf took third place and  Union Compact Freistadt took fourth place.
 July 6 & 7: EFA 2019 Fistball Men's Champions Cup in  Pfungstadt
 In the final,  TSV Pfungstadt defeated  VfK Berlin, 4–1 (1–11, 11–4, 11–7, 11–6, 11–6).
  Union Tigers Vöcklabruck took third place and  TSV Wigoltingen took fourth place.
 July 13 & 14: EFA 2019 U18 Men's & Women's European Championship in  Hohenlockstedt
 In the men's final,  defeated , 3–2 (4–11, 11–9, 15–13, 8–11, 14–12).
 In the women's final,  defeated , 3–0 (11–6, 11–5, 11–8).
 July 18 – 20: EFA European Women's and Men's U21 Championship in  Lázně Bohdaneč
 In the men's U21 final,  defeated , 3–0 (11–7, 11–3, 11–7).
 In the women's final,  defeated , 3–1 (11–8, 9–11, 11–7, 11–8).
 August 11 – 17: 2019 Men's Fistball World Championships in  Winterthur
 September 13 – 15: IFA 2019 Fistball World Tour Final in  Salzburg

Floorball
 Women's World Floorball Championships
 Champion: 
 Men's under-19 World Floorball Championships
 Champion: 
 Champions Cup
 Men's champion:  Classic
 Women's champion:  IKSU

Freestyle skiing

Futsal

Golf

2019 Men's major golf championships
 April 11 – 14: 2019 Masters Tournament in  Augusta, Georgia
 Winner:  Tiger Woods (5th Masters title, 15th major title, & 81st PGA Tour win)
 May 16 – 19: 2019 PGA Championship in  Farmingdale, New York
 Winner:  Brooks Koepka (2nd PGA Championship title, 4th major title, & 6th PGA Tour win)
 June 13 – 16: 2019 U.S. Open in  Pebble Beach, California
 Winner:  Gary Woodland (first US Open title, first major title, & 4th PGA Tour win)
 July 18 – 21: 2019 Open Championship in  Portrush, County Antrim
 Winner:  Shane Lowry (first Open Championship title, first major title, & 2nd PGA Tour win)

2019 World Golf Championship (WGC)
 February 21 – 24: 2019 WGC-Mexico Championship in  Naucalpan at the Club de Golf Chapultepec
 Winner:  Dustin Johnson (second WGC-Mexico Championship win, 6th WGC win, & 20th PGA Tour win)
 March 27 – 31: 2019 WGC-Dell Technologies Match Play in  Austin, Texas
 Winner:  Kevin Kisner (first WGC win & 3rd PGA Tour win)
 July 25 – 28: 2019 WGC-FedEx St. Jude Invitational in  Memphis, Tennessee
 Winner:  Brooks Koepka (first WGC win & 7th PGA Tour win)
 October 31 – November 3: 2019 WGC-HSBC Champions in  Shanghai
 Winner:  Rory McIlroy (third WGC win & 18th PGA Tour win)

2019 Women's major golf championships
 April 4–7: 2019 ANA Inspiration in Rancho Mirage, California
 Winner:  Ko Jin-young (first major win and fourth LPGA win)
 May 30 – June 2: 2019 U.S. Women's Open in Charleston, South Carolina
 Winner:  Lee Jeong-eun (first major win and first LPGA win)
 June 20–23: 2019 Women's PGA Championship in Chaska, Minnesota
 Winner:  Hannah Green (first major win and first LPGA win)
 July 25–28: 2019 Evian Championship in Évian-les-Bains, France
 Winner:  Ko Jin-young (second major win and fifth LPGA win)
 August 1–4: 2019 Women's British Open in Milton Keynes, England
 Winner:  Hinako Shibuno (first major win and first LPGA win)

2019 Senior major golf championships
 May 9 – 13: The Tradition in  Hoover, Alabama
 Note: Due to rain, the tournament's fourth round would be played on May 13 (Monday).
 Winner:  Steve Stricker (first Major win & fourth PGA Tour Champions win)
 May 23 – 26: Senior PGA Championship in  Rochester, New York
 Winner:  Ken Tanigawa (first Major win & second PGA Tour Champions win)
 June 27 – 30: U.S. Senior Open in  Notre Dame, Indiana at Warren Golf Course
 Winner:  Steve Stricker (first Senior Open win, second Major win & fifth PGA Tour Champions win)
 July 11 – 14: Senior Players Championship in  Akron, Ohio
 Winner:  Retief Goosen (first Senior Players win & first PGA Tour Champions win)
 July 25 – 28: Senior Open Championship in  Lancashire, England
 Winner:  Bernhard Langer (fourth Senior Open win, eleventh senior major win, and 40th PGA Tour Champions win)

2019 Legends Tour (Senior women's major golf championships)
 May 16 – 19: 2019 U.S. Senior Women's Open in  Southern Pines, North Carolina
 Winner:  Helen Alfredsson (first Major & Legends Tour win)
 October 14 – 16: 2019 Senior LPGA Championship in  French Lick Township, Indiana
 Winner:  Helen Alfredsson (second Major & Legends Tour win)

Other golf events
 March 14 – 17: 2019 Players Championship
 Winner:  Rory McIlroy (first Players Championship title & 15th PGA Tour victory)
 September 13 – 15: 2019 Solheim Cup in  Auchterarder
  Team Europe defeated  Team USA, 14½–13½, to win their sixth Solheim Cup title.
 December 12 – 15: 2019 Presidents Cup in  Melbourne
  Team USA defeated the  International Team, 16–14, to win their eighth consecutive and eleventh overall Presidents Cup title.

Gymnastics

Handball

  defeated , 31–22, to win their first World Men's Handball Championship title.
  took third place.
 April 10 – 14: 2019 IHF Inter-Continental Trophy in  Prishtina
 Junior:  defeated , 30–26, to win their first IHF Inter-Continental Trophy title.
  took third place.
 Youth:  defeated , 27–26, to win their first IHF Inter-Continental Trophy title.
  took third place.
 June 8 – 16: 2019 IHF Emerging Nations Championship in  Tbilisi
  defeated , 31–21, to win their first IHF Emerging Nations Championship title.
  took third place.
 July 16 – 28: 2019 Men's Junior World Handball Championship in 
  defeated , 28–23, to win their second Men's Junior World Handball Championship title.
  took third place.
 August 1 – 4: 2019 IHF Women's Super Globe in 
  1º de Agosto defeated  China National Club, 27–22, to win their first IHF Women's Super Globe title.
  UnC Concórdia took third place.
 August 6 – 18: 2019 Men's Youth World Handball Championship in 
  defeated , 32–28, to win their first Men's Youth World Handball Championship title.
  took third place. 
 August 26 – September 1: 2019 IHF Super Globe in 
  FC Barcelona defeated  THW Kiel, 34–32, to win their fifth IHF Super Globe title.
  RK Vardar took third place.
 November 30 – December 15: 2019 World Women's Handball Championship in  Kumamoto

EHF
 September 12, 2018 – June 2: 2018–19 EHF Champions League
 In the final,  RK Vardar defeated  Telekom Veszprém, 27–24, to win their 2nd EHF Champions League.
  Barcellona Lassa took third place and  PGE Vive Kielce took fourth place.
 RK Vardar has qualified to compete at the 2019 IHF Super Globe.
 September 1, 2018 – May 19: 2018–19 EHF Cup
 In the final,  THW Kiel defeated  Füchse Berlin, 26–22, to win their 4th EHF Cup.
  FC Porto took third place and  TTH Holstebro took fourth place.
 September 7, 2018 – May 12: 2018–19 Women's EHF Champions League
 In the final,  Győri Audi KC defeated  Rostov-Don, 25–24, to win their 5th Women's EHF Champions league.
  Vipers Kristiansand took third place and  Metz Handball took fourth place.
 September 8, 2018 – May 12: 2018–19 Women's EHF Cup
 In the final,  Siófok KC defeated  Team Esbjerg, 47–42 in aggregate, to win their 1st Women's EHF Cup.
  Viborg HK took third place and  Herning-Ikast Håndbold took fourth place.
 October 6, 2018 – May 18: 2018–19 EHF Challenge Cup
 In the final,  CSM București defeated  Madeira Andebol SAD, 48–42 in aggregate, to win their 1st EHF Challenge Cup.
 November 9, 2018 – May 12: 2018–19 CEV Women's Challenge Cup
 In the final,  BM Remudas defeated  Pogoń Baltica Szczecin, 53–47 in aggregate, to win their 2nd CEV Women's Challenge Cup.

Other competitions
 August 28, 2018 – April 3: 2018–19 SEHA League
 In the final,  RK Vardar defeated  RK Zagreb, 26–23, to win their 5th SEHA League.
  HC Meshkov Brest took third place and  RK Nexe Našice took fourth place.
 September 1, 2018 – May 19: 2018–19 MOL Liga Women
 In the finals,  IUVENTA Michalovce and  DHK Baník Most defeated  ŠŠK SLŠ Prešov and  DHC Slavia Praha.
  HKM Sala and  DHC Sokol Poruba took third places and  HK Sokol RMK Bánovce nad Bebravou and  HC Britterm Veselí took fourth places.
 September 15, 2018 – March 31: 2018–19 BeNe League
 In the final,  HC Achilles Bocholt defeated  HC Visé BM, 30–27.
  Limburg Lions took third place and  HV Aalsmeer took fourth place.
 September 16, 2018 – April 21: 2018–19 Baltic Handball League (final four in  Minsk)
 In the final,  Riihimäki Cocks defeated  ZTR Zaporizhia, 23–22, to win their 4th consecutive title.
  SKA Minsk took third place and  Dragūnas Klaipėda took fourth place.

Teams events
 July 11 – 21: 2019 Women's U-19 European Handball Championship in  Győr
 In the final,  defeated , 27–20, to win their 1st title.
  took third place and  took fourth place.
 July 13 – 21: 2019 Women's U-19 EHF Handball Championship (Division II) – Group 2  Varna (debut event)
 In the final,  defeated , 22–20, to win their 1st title.
  took third place and  took fourth place.
 July 15 – 21: 2019 Women's U-19 EHF Handball Championship (Division II) – Group 1 in  Kaunas/Klaipėda (debut event)
 In the final,  defeated , 30–24, to win their 1st title.
  took third place and  took fourth place.
 August 1 – 11: 2019 European Women's U-17 Handball Championship in  Celje
 In the final  defeated , 28–24, to win their 1st title.
  took third place and  took fourth place.
 August 3 – 11: 2019 European Women's U-17 Handball Championship (Division II) – Group 1 in  Tbilisi (debut event)
 August 3 – 11: 2019 European Women's U-17 Handball Championship (Division II) – Group 2 in  Lignano Sabbiadoro (debut event)

CAHB
 February 25 – March 1: IHF Trophy Africa – Zone 3 (women's youth & junior) in  Niamey
 Youth: 1st place: , 2nd place: , 3rd place: , 4th place: 
 Junior: 1st place: , 2nd place: , 3rd place: , 4th place: 
 March 10 – 16: IHF Trophy Africa – Zone 5 in  Zanzibar
 Youth: 1st place: , 2nd place: , 3rd place: , 4th place: , 5th. , 6th. , 7th. , 8th. 
 Junior: 1st place: , 2nd place: , 3rd place: , 4th place: , 5th. , 6th. , 7th. , 8th. 
 March 31 – April 4: IHF Trophy Africa – Zone 2 in  Nouakchott
 Youth: 1st place: , 2nd place: , 3rd place: , 4th place: , 5th. , 6th. 
 Junior: 1st place: , 2nd place: , 3rd place: , 4th place: , 5th. , 6th. 
 April 3: 2019 African Handball Super Cup in  Oudja
 Men:  Zamalek SC defeated  Al Ahly, 38–35, to win their 5th title.
 Women:  1º de Agosto defeated  Petro de Luanda, 19–13, to win their 4th title.
 Zamalek SC has qualified to compete at the 2019 IHF Super Globe.
 April 5 – 14: 2019 African Handball Cup Winners' Cup in  Oudja
 In the final,  ES Sahel defeated  Al Ahly, 28–24, to win their 2nd title.  Espérance ST took third place and  Mouloudia Oujda took fourth place.
 April 5 – 14: 2019 African Women's Handball Cup Winners' Cup in  Oudja
 In the final,  1º de Agosto defeated  Petro de Luanda, 28–16, to win their 4th title.  DGSP took third place and  FAP Yaoundé took fourth place.
 May 22 – 26: IHF Women's Trophy Africa – Zone IV in  Kinshasa
 Youth: 1st place: , 2nd place: , 3rd place: , 4th place: 
 Junior: 1st place: , 2nd place: , 3rd place: , 4th place: 
 September 6 – 15: 2019 African Women's Junior Handball Championship in 
 In the final,  defeated , 26–25.  took third place and  took fourth place.
 September 18 – 26: 2019 African Women's Youth Handball Championship in 
 Round Robin: 1st place: , 2nd place: , 3rd place: , 4th place: 
 October 17 – 26: 2019 African Handball Champions League in

AHF
 March 20 – April 2: 2018 Asian Men's Club League Handball Championship in 
 In the final,  Al-Duhail SC defeated  Al-Wakrah SC, 22–21, to win their 2nd Asian Men's Club League Handball Championship.
  Al Sharjah took third place.
 Note: Al-Duhail SC has qualified to compete at the 2019 IHF Super Globe.
 May 1 – 5: IHF Trophy Asia – Zone 1B in  Jakarta
 Youth: In the final,  defeated , 32–12.
  took third place and  took fourth place.
 Junior: In the final,  defeated , 46–12.
  took third place and  took fourth place.
 May 6 – 10: IHF Trophy Asia – Zone 3 in  Ulaanbaatar
 Youth: 1st place: , 2nd place: , 3rd place: , 4th place: , 5th. 
 Junior: 1st place: , 2nd place: , 3rd place: , 4th place: , 5th. 
 May 26 – 30: IHF Trophy Asia – Zone 1A in  Taichung
 Youth: 1st place: , 2nd place: , 3rd place: , 4th place: 
 Junior: 1st place: , 2nd place: , 3rd place: , 4th place: , 5th. 
 June 15 – 22: 2019 Asian Beach Handball Championship for Men and Women in  Weihai
 Men: Champions: ; Second: ; Third: ; Fourth: ;
 Women: Champions: ; Second: ; Third: ; Fourth: ;
 June 16 – 23: 2019 Asian Women's Club League Handball Championship in  Astana
 Champions:  Kaisar Club; Second:  4.25 Club; Third:  Almaty Club; Fourth:  AGMK Club;
 Kaisar Club has qualified to compete at the 2019 IHF Women's Super Globe.
 July 20 – 29: 2019 Asian Women's U19 Handball Championship in  Beirut
 August 21 – 30: 2019 Asian Women's Youth Handball Championship in  Jaipur
 In the final,  defeated , 32–14, to win their 8th Asian Women's Youth Handball Championship title.
  took third place.
 November 9 – 21: 2019 Asian Men's Club League Handball Championship in

North America and Caribbean
National teams
 April 8 – 14: 2019 IHF North American and Caribbean Emerging Nations Championship in  Santo Domingo
 In the final,  defeated , 37–36, to win their 1st IHF North American and Caribbean Emerging Nations Championship.  took third place and  took fourth place.
Clubs
 May 9 – 12: 2019 IHF North American and Caribbean Super Globe Qualifier in  Lake Placid
  NYC Team Handball won the round robin tournament with  Handball Québec in second and  Los Angeles Team Handball Club in third.
 Note: NYC Team Handball has qualified to compete at the 2019 IHF Super Globe.

South and Central America
National teams
 April 3 – 7: 2019 South and Central American Men's Junior Handball Championship in  Palmira
 Note: All teams mentioned above have qualified to compete at the 2019 Men's Junior World Handball Championship.
 May 7 – 13: 2019 South and Central American Men's Youth Handball Championship in  Taubaté
 Note: All teams mentioned above have qualified to compete at the 2019 Men's Youth World Handball Championship.
 July 11 – 14: 2019 South and Central American Beach Handball Championship in  Maricá
 Men:  defeated  2–0 to win the first ever South and Central American Beach Handball Championship.
  took third place
 Women:  defeated  2–0 to win the first ever South and Central American Beach Handball Championship.
  took third place
Clubs
 March 12 – 16: 2019 South and Central American Women's Club Handball Championship in  Concórdia
  UnC Concórdia won the round robin tournament with  UNIP São Bernardo in second and  Ferro Carril Oeste in third.
 Note: UnC Concórdia has qualified to compete at the 2019 IHF Women's Super Globe.
 May 22 – 26: 2019 South and Central American Men's Club Handball Championship in  Taubaté
  Handebol Taubaté defeated  UNLu, 27–21, to win the first South and Central American Men's Club Handball Championship title.
  EC Pinheiros took third place.
 Note: Handebol Taubaté has qualified to compete at the 2019 IHF Super Globe.

OCHF
 February 21 – 24: 2019 Oceania Beach Handball Championships in  Glenelg
 Men's:  defeated , 2–0.  took third place and  took fourth place.
 Women's:  defeated , 2–1.  took third place and  took fourth place.
 August 11 – 17: IHF Trophy Oceania in  Païta

Horse racing

Ice climbing

Ice hockey

Judo

Karate

Kickboxing

Korfball

Europe
 January 10 – 12: 53rd IKF Europa Cup in  Kortrijk
 In the final,  TOP/SolarCompleet defeated  Boeckenberg KC, 31–16.  Trojans KC took third place and  SG Pegasus took fourth place.
 January 25 – 27: IKF Europa Shield in  Prostějov
 In the final,  Bec Korfball Club defeated  KCC Sokol České Budějovice, 16–9.  SK RG Prostejov took third place and  CK Vallparadis/Assessoria took fourth place.
 July 5 – 9: U15 European Korfball Championship 2019 in  Dunakeszi
 Championship A: In the final,  1 defeated , 9–4.
  took third place.
 Championship B: In the final,  2 defeated  2, 8–6.
  2 took third place.
 October 15 – 19: IKF U21 European Korfball Championship 2019 in  Prostějov

Asia
 March 9 & 10: IKF Beach Korfball World Cup (Asia) 2019 in 
 Open group final ranking: 1st. , 2nd. , 3rd. , 4th. , 5th. 
 University Group final ranking: 1st. , 2nd. , 3rd. , 4th. 
 May 20 – 25: IKF U21 Asia Oceania Korfball Championship 2019 in  Shaoxing
 In the final,  defeated , 23–5.
  took third place.

World
 April 19 – 21: IKF U19 World Korfball Championship 2019 in  Leeuwarden
 In the final,  defeated , 19–18.
  took third place.
 June 28 – 30: U17 Korfball World Cup 2019 in  Eindhoven
 In the final,  defeated , 23–13.
  took third place.
 July 6 & 7: IKF Beach Korfball World Cup in  Bonson
 U19: In the final,  1 defeated  2, 6–4.
  1 took third place.
 Seniors: In the final,  defeated , 9–8 at free shots after a 7–7 draw .
  took third place.
 August 1 – 10: 2019 IKF World Korfball Championship in  Durban

Lacrosse

International Lacrosse events
 June 29 – July 6: 2019 Men's U20 European Lacrosse Championship in  Prague (debut event)
  defeated , 9–8, to win the inaugural Men's U20 European Lacrosse Championship title.
 The  took third place.
 July 16 – 25: 2019 Women's European Lacrosse Championship in  Netanya
  defeated , 10–7, to win their third consecutive and seventh overall Women's European Lacrosse Championship title.
  took third place.
 August 1 – 10: 2019 FIL Women's Under-19 World Lacrosse Championships in  Peterborough
 The  defeated , 13–3, to win their fifth Women's Under-19 World Lacrosse Championships title.
  took third place.
 September 19 – 28: 2019 World Indoor Lacrosse Championship in  Langley
  defeated , 19–12, to win their fifth consecutive World Indoor Lacrosse Championship title.
  took third place.

National Lacrosse League
 December 15, 2018 – April 27, 2019: 2019 NLL season
 Best regular season & East Division winners:  Buffalo Bandits
 West Division winners:  Saskatchewan Rush
 May 3 – 25: 2019 NLL playoffs
  Calgary Roughnecks defeated  Buffalo Bandits, 2–0 out of 3 games, to win their third NLL title.

Major League Lacrosse
 May 31 – October 6: 2019 Major League Lacrosse season
 The  Chesapeake Bayhawks defeated the  Denver Outlaws, 10–9, to win their fourth Major League Lacrosse title.

Luge

Modern pentathlon

Motorsport

2019 Formula One World Championship
 March 17:  2019 Australian Grand Prix Winner:  Valtteri Bottas ( Mercedes)
 March 31:  2019 Bahrain Grand Prix Winner:  Lewis Hamilton ( Mercedes)
 April 14:  2019 Chinese Grand Prix Winner:  Lewis Hamilton ( Mercedes)
 April 28:  2019 Azerbaijan Grand Prix Winner:  Valtteri Bottas ( Mercedes)
 May 12:  2019 Spanish Grand Prix Winner:  Lewis Hamilton ( Mercedes)
 May 26:  2019 Monaco Grand Prix Winner:  Lewis Hamilton ( Mercedes)
 June 9:  2019 Canadian Grand Prix Winner:  Lewis Hamilton ( Mercedes)
 June 23:  2019 French Grand Prix Winner:  Lewis Hamilton ( Mercedes)
 June 30:  2019 Austrian Grand Prix Winner:  Max Verstappen ( Red Bull Racing-Honda)
 July 14:  2019 British Grand Prix Winner:  Lewis Hamilton ( Mercedes)
 July 28:  2019 German Grand Prix Winner:  Max Verstappen ( Red Bull Racing-Honda)
 August 4:  2019 Hungarian Grand Prix Winner:  Lewis Hamilton ( Mercedes)
 September 1:  2019 Belgian Grand Prix Winner:  Charles Leclerc ( Ferrari)
 September 8:  2019 Italian Grand Prix Winner:  Charles Leclerc ( Ferrari)
 September 22:  2019 Singapore Grand Prix Winner:  Sebastian Vettel ( Ferrari)
 September 29:  2019 Russian Grand Prix Winner:  Lewis Hamilton ( Mercedes)
 October 13:  2019 Japanese Grand Prix Winner:  Valtteri Bottas ( Mercedes)
 October 27:  2019 Mexican Grand Prix Winner:  Lewis Hamilton ( Mercedes)
 November 3:  2019 United States Grand Prix  Valtteri Bottas ( Mercedes)
 November 17:  2019 Brazilian Grand Prix  Max Verstappen ( Red Bull Racing-Honda)
 December 1:  2019 Abu Dhabi Grand Prix (final)  Lewis Hamilton ( Mercedes)

2018–19 Formula E season
 December 15, 2018:  2018 Ad Diriyah ePrix Winner:  António Félix da Costa ( BMW i Andretti Motorsport)
 January 12:  2019 Marrakesh ePrix Winner:  Jérôme d'Ambrosio ( Mahindra Racing)
 January 27:  2019 Santiago ePrix Winner:  Sam Bird ( Envision Virgin Racing)
 February 17:  2019 Mexico City ePrix Winner:  Lucas di Grassi ( Audi Sport Abt Schaeffler Formula E Team)
 March 10:  2019 Hong Kong ePrix Winner:  Edoardo Mortara ( Venturi Formula E Team)
 March 23:  2019 Sanya ePrix Winner:  Jean-Éric Vergne ( DS Techeetah)
 April 13:  2019 Rome ePrix Winner:  Mitch Evans ( Panasonic Jaguar Racing)
 April 27:  2019 Paris ePrix Winner:  Robin Frijns ( Envision Virgin Racing)
 May 11:  2019 Monaco ePrix Winner:  Jean-Éric Vergne ( DS Techeetah)
 May 25:  2019 Berlin ePrix Winner:  Lucas di Grassi ( Audi Sport Abt Schaeffler Formula E Team)
 June 22:  2019 Swiss ePrix Winner:  Jean-Éric Vergne ( DS Techeetah)
 July 13 & 14:  2019 New York City ePrix (final)
 Winners: Race 1:  Sebastien Buemi ( Nissan e.dams) / Race 2:  Robin Frijns ( Envision Virgin Racing)

2019 MotoGP season
 March 10:  2019 Qatar motorcycle Grand Prix
 MotoGP winner:  Andrea Dovizioso
 Moto2 winner:  Lorenzo Baldassarri
 Moto3 winner:  Kaito Toba
 March 31:  2019 Argentine motorcycle Grand Prix
 MotoGP winner:  Marc Márquez
 Moto2 winner:  Lorenzo Baldassarri
 Moto3 winner:  Jaume Masiá
 April 14:  2019 Motorcycle Grand Prix of the Americas
 MotoGP winner:  Álex Rins
 Moto2 winner:  Thomas Lüthi
 Moto3 winner:  Arón Canet
 May 5:  2019 Spanish motorcycle Grand Prix
 MotoGP winner:  Marc Márquez
 Moto2 winner:  Lorenzo Baldassarri
 Moto3 winner:  Niccolò Antonelli
 May 19:  2019 French motorcycle Grand Prix
 MotoGP winner:  Marc Márquez
 Moto2 winner:  Álex Márquez
 Moto3 winner:  John McPhee
 June 2:  2019 Italian motorcycle Grand Prix
 MotoGP winner:  Danilo Petrucci
 Moto2 winner:  Álex Márquez
 Moto3 winner:  Tony Arbolino
 June 16:  2019 Catalan motorcycle Grand Prix
 MotoGP winner:  Marc Márquez
 Moto2 winner:  Álex Márquez
 Moto3 winner:  Marcos Ramírez
 June 30:  2019 Dutch TT
 MotoGP winner:  Maverick Viñales
 Moto2 winner:  Augusto Fernández
 Moto3 winner:  Tony Arbolino
 July 7:  2019 German motorcycle Grand Prix
 MotoGP winner:  Marc Márquez
 Moto2 winner:  Álex Márquez
 Moto3 winner:  Lorenzo Dalla Porta
 August 4:  2019 Czech Republic motorcycle Grand Prix
 MotoGP winner:  Marc Márquez
 Moto2 winner:  Álex Márquez
 Moto3 winner:  Arón Canet
 August 11:  2019 Austrian motorcycle Grand Prix
 MotoGP winner:  Andrea Dovizioso
 Moto2 winner:  Brad Binder
 Moto3 winner:  Romano Fenati
 August 25:  2019 British motorcycle Grand Prix
 MotoGP winner:  Álex Rins
 Moto2 winner:  Augusto Fernández
 Moto3 winner:  Marcos Ramírez
 September 15:  2019 San Marino and Rimini's Coast motorcycle Grand Prix
 September 22:  2019 Aragon motorcycle Grand Prix
 October 6:  2019 Thailand motorcycle Grand Prix
 October 20:  2019 Japanese motorcycle Grand Prix
 October 27:  2019 Australian motorcycle Grand Prix
 November 3:  2019 Malaysian motorcycle Grand Prix
 November 17:  2019 Valencian Community motorcycle Grand Prix (final)

2019 Superbike World Championship
 February 23 & 24: #1 in  Phillip Island Grand Prix Circuit
 Race 1, Superpole Race, Race 2 Winner:  Álvaro Bautista ( ARUBA.IT Racing – Ducati)
 March 16 & 17: #2 in  Chang International Circuit
 Race 1, Superpole Race, Race 2 Winner:  Álvaro Bautista ( ARUBA.IT Racing – Ducati)
 April 6 & 7: #3 in  Motorland Aragón
 Race 1, Superpole Race, Race 2 Winner:  Álvaro Bautista ( ARUBA.IT Racing – Ducati)
 April 14: #4 in  TT Circuit Assen
 Race 1, Race 2 Winner:  Álvaro Bautista ( ARUBA.IT Racing – Ducati)
 Superpole Race was cancelled due to the postponement of Race 1 from Saturday to Sunday (snowfall).
 May 11 & 12: #5 in  Autodromo Enzo e Dino Ferrari
 Race 1, Superpole Race Winner:  Jonathan Rea ( Kawasaki Racing Team WorldSBK)
 Race 2 was cancelled due to torrential rain.
 June 8 & 9: #6 in  Circuito de Jerez
 Race 1, Superpole Race winner:  Álvaro Bautista ( ARUBA.IT Racing – Ducati)
 Race 2 winner:  Michael van der Mark ( Pata Yamaha WorldSBK Team)
 June 22 & 23: #7 in  Misano World Circuit Marco Simoncelli
 Race 1, Race 2 winner:  Jonathan Rea ( Kawasaki Racing Team WorldSBK
 Superpole Race winner:  Álvaro Bautista ( ARUBA.IT Racing – Ducati) 
 July 6 & 7: #8 in  Donington Park
 Race 1, Superpole Race, Race 2 Winner:  Jonathan Rea ( Kawasaki Racing Team WorldSBK)
 July 13 & 14: #9 in  WeatherTech Raceway Laguna Seca
 Race 1, Superpole Race Winner:  Jonathan Rea ( Kawasaki Racing Team WorldSBK)
 Race 2 Winner:  Chaz Davies ( ARUBA.IT Racing – Ducati)
 September 7 & 8: #10 in  Algarve International Circuit
 September 28 & 29: #11 in  Circuit de Nevers Magny-Cours
 October 12 & 13: #12 in  Circuito San Juan Villicum
 October 25 & 26: #13 in  Losail International Circuit (final)

Touring car racing

2019 WTCR
 April 6 & 7:  Race of Morocco
 Race 1 winner:  Esteban Guerrieri ( ALL-INKL.COM Münnich Motorsport)
 Race 2 winner:  Gabriele Tarquini ( BRC Hyundai N Squadra Corse)
 Race 3 winner:  Thed Björk ( Cyan Racing Lynk & Co)
 April 27 & 28:  Race of Hungary
 Race 1 winner:  Néstor Girolami ( ALL-INKL.COM Münnich Motorsport)
 Race 2 winner:  Néstor Girolami ( ALL-INKL.COM Münnich Motorsport)
 Race 3 winner:  Gabriele Tarquini ( BRC Hyundai N Squadra Corse)
 May 10 – 12:  Race of Slovakia
 Race 1 winner:  Frédéric Vervisch ( Comtoyou Team Audi Sport)
 Race 2 winner:  Néstor Girolami ( ALL-INKL.COM Münnich Motorsport)
 Race 3 winner:  Ma Qing Hua ( Mulsanne Srl)
 May 18 & 19:  Race of the Netherlands
 Race 1 winner:  Thed Björk ( Cyan Racing Lynk & Co)
 Race 2 winner:  Esteban Guerrieri ( ALL-INKL.COM Münnich Motorsport)
 Race 3 winner:  Thed Björk ( Cyan Racing Lynk & Co)
 June 21 & 22:  Race of Germany
 Race 1 winner:  Norbert Michelisz ( BRC Hyundai N Squadra Corse)
 Race 2 winner:  Johan Kristoffersson ( SLR Volkswagen)
 Race 3 winner:  Benjamin Leuchter ( SLR Volkswagen)
 July 6 & 7:  Race of Portugal
 Race 1 winner:  Norbert Michelisz ( BRC Hyundai N Squadra Corse)
 Race 2 winner:  Mikel Azcona ( PWR Racing)
 Race 3 winner:  Tiago Monteiro ( KCMG)
 September 14 & 15:  Race of China
 October 26 & 27:  Race of Japan
 November 16 & 17:  Guia Race of Macau
 December 7 & 8:  Race of Malaysia (final)

2019 Blancpain GT Series
 April 14:  3 Hours of Monza Winners:
 Pro:  #54 Dinamic Motorsport
 Silver:  #90 AKKA ASP Team
 Pro-Am:  #93 Tempesta Racing
 Am:  #77 Barwell Motorsport
 May 5:  GT World Challenge Europe Brands Hatch
 Pro:  #4 Black Falcon (both)
 Silver:  #89 AKKA ASP Team (both)
 Pro-Am:  #333 Rinaldi Racing (Race 1) /  #519 Orange1 FFF Racing Team (Race 2)
 Am:  #444 HB Racing (both)
 May 12:  3 Hours of Silverstone
 Pro:  #72 SMP Racing
 Silver:  #19 GRT Grasser Racing Team
 Pro-Am:  #52 AF Corse
 Am:  #77 Barwell Motorsport
 June 1:  6 Hours of Castellet
 Pro:  #107 Bentley Team M-Sport
 Silver:  #90 AKKA ASP Team
 Pro-Am:  #87 AKKA ASP Team
 Am:  #188 Garage 59
 June 30:  GT World Challenge Europe Misano
 Pro:  #563 Orange1 FFF Racing Team (Race 1) /  #2 Belgian Audi Club Team WRT (Race 2)
 Silver:  #89 AKKA ASP Team (Race 1) /  #90 AKKA ASP Team (Race 2)
 Pro-Am:  #52 AF Corse (Race 1) /  #519 Orange1 FFF Racing Team (Race 2)
 Am:  #444 HB Racing (both)
 July 14:  GT World Challenge Europe Zandvoort
 Pro:  #88 AKKA ASP Team (Race 1) /  #25 Saintéloc Racing (Race 2)
 Silver:  #62 R-Motorsport (both)
 Pro-Am:  #519 Orange1 FFF Racing Team (Race 1) /  #333 Rinaldi Racing (Race 2)
 Am:  #444 HB Racing (both)
 July 27 & 28:  2019 Total 24 hours of Spa
 September 1:  GT World Challenge Europe Nürburgring
 September 8:  GT World Challenge Europe Mogyoród
 September 29:  3 Hours of Barcelona (final)

2019 Deutsche Tourenwagen Masters
 May 4 & 5:  Hockenheimring #1
 Race 1 winner:  Marco Wittmann
 Race 2 winner:  René Rast
 May 18 & 19:  Heusden-Zolder
 Race 1 winner:  Philipp Eng
 Race 2 winner:  René Rast
 June 8 & 9:  Misano
 Race 1 winner:  Marco Wittmann
 Race 2 winner:  Nico Müller
 July 6 & 7:  Norisring
 Race 1 winner:  René Rast
 Race 2 winner:  Bruno Spengler
 July 20 & 21:  Assen
 Race 1 winner:  Marco Wittmann
 Race 2 winner:  Mike Rockenfeller
 August 10 & 11:  Brands Hatch
 Race 1 winner:  Marco Wittmann
 Race 2 winner:  René Rast
 August 24 & 25:  Lausitzring
 Race 1 winner:  Nico Müller
 Race 2 winner:  René Rast
 September 14 & 15:  Nürburgring
 Race 1 winner:  René Rast
 Race 2 winner:  Jamie Green
 October 5 & 6:  Hockenheimring #2 (final)
 Race 1 winner:  René Rast
 Race 2 winner:  Nico Müller

Endurance

2019–2020 World Endurance Championship
 September 1:  4 Hours of Silverstone
 October 6:  6 Hours of Fuji
 November 10:  4 hours of Shanghai
 December 14:  8 Hours of Bahrain
 February 1, 2020:  6 Hours of São Paulo
 March 2020:  1000 km of Sebring
 May 2, 2020:  6 Hours of Spa-Francorchamps
 June 13 & 14, 2020:  2020 24 Hours of Le Mans (final)

2018–2019 Endurance World Championship
 September 15 & 16, 2018:  2018 Bol d'Or Winners:  #1 F.C.C TSR Honda France
 April 20 & 21:  2019 24 Hours of Le Mans Winners:  #11 Team SRC Kawasaki France
 May 11:  2019 8 Hours of Slovakia Ring Winners:  #7 YART Yamaha
 June 8:  2019 8 Hours of Oschersleben Winners:  #1 F.C.C TSR Honda France
 July 28:  2019 Suzuka 8 Hours (final)

Rallying

2019 World Rally Championship
 January 24 – 27:  2019 Monte Carlo Rally Winner:  Sébastien Ogier ( Citroën World Rally Team)
 February 14 – 17:  2019 Rally Sweden Winner:  Ott Tänak ( Toyota Gazoo Racing WRT)
 March 7 – 10:  2019 Rally Mexico Winner:  Sébastien Ogier ( Citroën World Rally Team)
 March 28 – 31:  2019 Tour de Corse Winner:  Thierry Neuville ( Hyundai Shell Mobis WRT)
 April 25 – 28:  2019 Rally Argentina Winner:  Thierry Neuville ( Hyundai Shell Mobis WRT)
 May 9 – 12:  2019 Rally Chile Winner:  Ott Tänak ( Toyota Gazoo Racing WRT)
 May 30 – June 2:  2019 Rally de Portugal Winner:  Ott Tänak ( Toyota Gazoo Racing WRT)
 June 13 – 16:  2019 Rally Italia Sardegna Winner:  Daniel Sordo ( Hyundai Shell Mobis WRT)
 August 1 – 4:  2019 Rally Finland Winner:  Ott Tänak ( Toyota Gazoo Racing WRT)
 August 22 – 25:  2019 Rallye Deutschland Winner:  Ott Tänak ( Toyota Gazoo Racing WRT)
 September 12 – 15:  2019 Rally of Turkey Winner:  Sébastien Ogier ( Citroën World Rally Team)
 October 3 – 6:  2019 Wales Rally GB Winner:  Ott Tänak ( Toyota Gazoo Racing WRT)
 October 24 – 27:  2019 Rally de España
 November 14 – 17:  2019 Rally Australia (final)

Rally raid

2019 Dakar Rally
 January 6 – 17: 2019 Dakar Rally in 
 Bikes winner:  Toby Price (Red Bull KTM Factory Racing)
 Cars winner:  Nasser Al-Attiyah (Toyota Gazoo Racing SA)
 Quads winner:  Nicolás Cavigliasso (Dragon Racing)
 SxS winner:  Francisco López Contardo (South Racing Can-Am)
 Trucks winner:  Eduard Nikolaev (Kamaz-Master)

2019 FIA World Cup for Cross-Country Rallies
 February 21–26: 2019  Qatar Cross Country Rally
T1 winner:  Nasser Al-Attiyah (Toyota Gazoo Racing SA)
T2 winner:  Mohammed Al-Meer (QMMF Team)
T3 winner:  Reinaldo Varela (Monster Energy Can-Am)
T4 winner:  Ibrahim Al-Muhana (Al-Muhana)
 March 30 - April 4: 2019  Abu Dhabi Desert Challenge
T1 winner:  Stephane Peterhansel (X-Raid Mini)
T2 winner:  Mohammed Al-Meer (QMMF Team)
T3 winner:  Casey Currie (Monster Energy Can-Am)
T4 winner:  
 May 26 - June 1: 2019  Rally Kazakhstan
T1 winner:  Nasser Al-Attiyah (Toyota Gazoo Racing SA)
T2 winner:  Mohammed Al-Meer (QMMF Team)
T3 winner:  Reinaldo Varela (Monster Energy Can-Am)
T4 winner:  Dimitry Sotnikov (Kamaz Master Team)
 October 3–9: 2019  Rallye du Maroc
T1 winner:  Giniel de Villiers (Toyota Gazoo Racing SA)
T2 winner:  Tomasz Baranowski (Tomasz Baranowski)
T3 winner:  Reinaldo Varela (Monster Energy Can-Am)
T4 winner:  Jaroslav Valtr Sr (Valtr Racing Team)

2019 FIM Cross-Country Rallies World Championship
 March 30 - April 4: 2019  Abu Dhabi Desert Challenge
Bikes winner:  Sam Sunderland (Red Bull KTM Factory Racing)
Quads winner:  Fahad Al Musallam (Fahad Al Musallam)
 July 6–16: 2019  Silk Way Rally
Bikes winner:  Sam Sunderland (Red Bull KTM Factory Racing)
Quads winner:  Rafał Sonik (Sonik Team)
 September 1–7: 2019  Atacama Rally
Bikes winner:  Pablo Quintanilla (Rockstar Energy Husqvarna Factory Racing)
Quads winner:  Rafał Sonik (Sonik Team)
 October 3–9: 2019  Rallye du Maroc
Bikes winner:  Andrew Short (Rockstar Energy Husqvarna Factory Racing)
Quads winner:  Ignacio Casale (Ignacio Casale)

2019 FIA World Cup for Cross-Country Bajas
 February 14–17: 2019  Baja Russia - Northern Forest
T1 winner:  Tapio Lauronen (RE Autoklubs)
T2 winner:  Aldia Vilcans (VA Motorsports)
T3 winner:  Michele Cinotto (CR Racing)
 March 7–9: 2019  Dubai International Baja
T1 winner:  Jakub Przygonski (Orlen Team/X-Raid)
T2 winner:  Alexander Baranenko (VA Motorsports)
T3 winner:  Adel Abdulla (QMMF Team)
 June 20–23: 2019  Italian Baja
T1 winner:  Orlando Terranova (X-Raid)
T2 winner:  
T3 winner:  Fedor Vorobyev (Zavidovo Racing Team)
 July 25–28: 2019  Baja Aragón
T1 winner:  Orlando Terranova (X-Raid)
T2 winner:  Joao Ferreira (Joao Ferreira)
T3 winner:  Santi Navarro (FN Speed Team)
 August 8–11: 2019  Hungarian Baja
T1 winner:  Orlando Terranova (X-Raid)
T2 winner:  Claudiu Barbu (Transcarpatic Rally Team)
T3 winner:  Fedor Vorobyev (Zavidovo Racing Team)
 August 29 - September 1: 2019  Baja Poland
T1 winner:  Krzysztof Holowczyc (X-Raid)
T2 winner:  Aldis Vilcans (VA Motorsports)
T3 winner:  Fedor Vorobyev (Zavidovo Racing Team)
 September 19–21: 2019  Jordan Baja
T1 winner:  Jakub Przygonski (Orlen Team/X-Raid)
T2 winner:  
T3 winner:  Fedor Vorobyev (Zavidovo Racing Team)
 October 24–26: 2019  Baja de Partalegre 500
T1 winner:  Orlando Terranova (X-Raid)
T2 winner:  Joao Ferreira (Joao Ferreira)
T3 winner:  Fedor Vorobyev (Zavidovo Racing Team)

2019 FIM Bajas World Cup
 March 7–9: 2019  Dubai International Baja
Bikes winner:  Aaron Mare (Aaron Mare)
Quads winner:  Khalifa Al Raisse (Khalifa Al Raisse)
 March 23–24: 2019  Baja do Pinhal
Bikes winner:  Benjamin Melot (Benjamin Melot)
Quads winner:  Luís Engeitado (Luís Engeitado)
 July 26–28: 2019  Baja Aragón
Bikes winner:  Michael Metge (Michael Metge)
Quads winner:  Daniel Vila Vaques (Daniel Vila Vaques)
 August 9–11: 2019  Hungarian Baja
Bikes winner:  Adam Tomiczek (Adam Tomiczek)
Quads winner:  Juraj Varga (Juraj Varga)

Multi-sport events
 February 10 – 15: 2019 European Youth Olympic Winter Festival in  Sarajevo and Istočno Sarajevo
  won the gold medal tally. Norway and  won 12 overall medals each.
 March 2 – 12: 2019 Winter Universiade in  Krasnoyarsk
  won both the gold and overall medal tallies.
 March 14 – 21: 2019 Special Olympics World Summer Games in  Abu Dhabi
 For detailed results, click here and double-click a red dot or the sport of choice.
 March 14 – 23: 2019 South American Beach Games in  Rosario
  won both the gold and overall medal tallies.
 May 27 – June 1: 2019 Games of the Small States of Europe in  Budva
  won both the gold and overall medal tallies.
 June 14 – 23: 2019 African Beach Games in  Sal (debut event)
  won the gold medal tally. Morocco and  won 16 overall medals each.
 June 21 – 30: 2019 European Games in  Minsk
  won both the gold and overall medal tallies.
 July 3 – 14: 2019 Summer Universiade in  Naples
  won the gold medal tally. Japan and  won 82 overall medals each.
 July 6 – 12: 2019 Island Games in 
  won both the gold and overall medal tallies.
 July 8 – 20: 2019 Pacific Games in  Apia
  New Caledonia won both the gold and overall medal tallies.
 July 19 – 28: 2019 Indian Ocean Island Games in  Port Louis
  won both the gold and overall medal tallies.
 July 21 – 27: 2019 European Youth Summer Olympic Festival in  Baku
  won both the gold and overall medal tallies.
 July 26 – August 11: 2019 Pan American Games in  Lima
 The  won both the gold and overall medal tallies.
 August 8 – 18: 2019 World Police and Fire Games in  Chengdu
 For results, click here.
 August 11 – 24: 12th East Africa Military Games in  Nairobi
 Basketball: 
 Netball: 
 Volleyball: 
 Cross Country:  (m) /  (f)
 August 16 – 31: 2019 African Games in  Rabat
  won both the gold and overall medal tallies.
 September 13 – 15: 2019 World Urban Games in  Budapest (debut event)
 The  and  won 3 gold medals each. The United States won the overall medal tally.
 October 12 – 16: 2019 World Beach Games in  Doha
  won the gold medal tally.  won the overall medal tally.
 October 18 – 27: 2019 Military World Games in  Wuhan
  won both the gold and overall medal tallies.
 November 22 – 30: 2019 Bolivarian Beach Games in  Vargas
 November 30 – December 11: 2019 Southeast Asian Games in  Clark, Subic, and Metro Manila
 December 1 – 13: 2019 South Asian Games in  Kathmandu and Pokhara

Netball
 January 13 – 20: 2019 Netball Quad Series (January) in  Liverpool & London
 Round Robin Final Ranking: 1st.  Australia, 2nd.  England, 3rd.  New Zealand, 4th.  South Africa
 July 12 – 21: 2019 Netball World Cup in  Liverpool
 Final Ranking: 1st.  New Zealand, 2nd.  Australia, 3rd.  England, 4th.  South Africa

Netball Europe
 March 1 – 3: Netball Europe U17 Championships 2019 in  Huddersfield
 Round Robin: 1st.  England, 2nd.  Wales, 3rd.  Scotland, 4th.  United Arab Emirates, 5th.  Northern Ireland
 March 8 – 10: Netball Europe U17 Challenge 2019 in 
 Round Robin: 1st.  Switzerland, 2nd.  Gibraltar, 3rd.  Isle of Man, 4th.  Ireland, 5th.  Malta

Nordic combined

Orienteering

2019 World Cup Series
 June 7 – 11: World Cup #1 in  Helsinki
 Middle winners:  Gustav Bergman (m) /  Tove Alexandersson
 Pursuit winners:  Gustav Bergman (m) /  Tove Alexandersson
 Sprint relay winners:  1 (Tove Alexandersson, Emil Svensk, Gustav Bergman, Karolin Ohlsson)
 August 14 – 16: World Cup #2 in  Østfold (part of 2019 World Orienteering Championships)
 September 26 – 29: World Cup #3 in  Basel
 October 25 – 29: World Cup #4 (final) in  Guangzhou

World and Continental Foot orienteering events
 April 29 – May 5: 2019 ISF World School Championships in Orienteering in 
 Long M1 School winners:  Axel Elmblad (m) /  Melina Lahdenperä (f)
 Middles M1 School winners:  Axel Elmblad (m) /  Melina Lahdenperä (f)
 Long M1 Selected winners:  Adam Jonáš (m) /  Hanna Lundberg (f)
 Middles M1 School winners:  Davis Solmanis (m) /  Elza Kuze (f)
 Long M2 School winners:  Euan Tryner (m) /  Zara Stewart (f)
 Middles M2 School winners:  Euan Tryner (m) /  Zara Stewart (f)
 Long M2 Selected winners:  Aimar Urquizo (m) /  Tille De Smul (f)
 Middles M2 Selected winners:  Emils Lazdans (m) /  Brigitte Panker (f)
 June 27 – 30: European Youth Orienteering Championships in  Grodno
 Long winners:  Martin Simsa (U16) &  Ferenc Jonas (U18) (m) /  Anna Karlova (U16) &  Csilla Gárdonyi (U18) (f)
 Sprint winners:  Konstantin Kunckel (U16) &  Stanislaw Kurzyp (U18) (m) /  Marketa Mulickova (U16) &  Malin Agervig Kristiansson (U18) (f)
 Sprint Relay winners:
  (Jakub Chaloupsky, Martin Simsa, Lukas Vitebsky) (U16) (m) /  1 (Fanny Kukonlehto, Eeva Liina Ojanaho, Salla Isoherranen) (U16) (f)
  (Aaro Ojala, Topias Arola, Touko Seppa) (U18) (m) /  (Mikaela Karjalainen, Maria Maattanen, Melina Lahdenpera) (U18) (f)
 July 6 – 12: World Masters Orienteering Championships in 
 Long: For results, click here
 Middle: For results, click here
 Sprint: For results, click here
 July 6 – 12: Junior World Orienteering Championships in 
 Sprint winners:  Aston Key (m) /  Eline Gemperle (f)
 Long winners:  Kasper Fosser (m) /  Veronika Kalinina (f)
 Middle winners:  Kasper Fosser (m) /  Isa Envall (f)
 Relay winners:  1 (m) /  1 (f)
 July 25 – 29: European University Orienteering Championships in 
 August 12 – 17: 2019 World Orienteering Championships in  Østfold
 August 20 – 25: Asian Junior and Youth Orienteering Championships in 
 September 28 – October 6: Oceania Orienteering Championships in 
 November 2: Central American and Caribbean Orienteering Championships in

2019 MTBO World Cup events
 June 8 – 10: World Cup #1 in  Wroclaw (part of European MTBO Championships)
 For results, see below.
 October 4 – 6: World Cup #3 (final) in 

World and Continental MTBO-orienteering events
 June 8 – 10: European MTBO Championships in  Wroclaw
 Mixed relay winners:  1
 Sprint winners:  Lauri Malsroos (m) /  Veronika Kubinova (f)
 Mass Start winners:  Anton Foliforov /  Camilla Sogaard (f)
 July 28 – August 3: World MTB Orienteering Championships 2019 in 
 July 28 – August 3: Junior World MTB Orienteering Championships in 
 October 3 – 6: European Junior and Youth MTB Orienteering Championships in 
 October 3 – 6: World Masters MTB Orienteering Championships 2019 in

2019 SkiO World Cup events
 No World Cup events this year scheduled

World and Continental Ski-orienteering events
 February 4 – 11: European Ski Orienteering Championships in 
 Long winners:  Lars Moholdt (m) /  Tove Alexandersson (f)
 Middle winners:  Erik Rost (m) /  Magdalena Olsson (f)
 Sprint winners:  Lars Moholdt (m) /  Alena Trapeznikova (f)
 Sprint Relay winners:  1 (Alena Trapeznikova & Sergey Gorlanov)
 Relay winners:  1 (Jørgen Baklid, Jørgen Madslien, Lars Moholdt) (m) /  1 (Alena Trapeznikova, Tatyana Oborina, Maria Kechkina)
 March 5 – 10: 2019 Winter Universiade SkiO events in  Krasnoyarsk
 Sprint winners:  Vladislav Kiselev (m) /  Liisa Nenonen (f)
 Pursuit winners:  Sergey Gorlanov (m) /  Marina Viatkina (f)
 Middle winners:  Jørgen Baklid (m) /  Liisa Nenonen (f)
 Sprint relay winners:  1 (Sergey Gorlanov & Marina Viatkina)
 March 20 – 24: European Youth Ski Orienteering Championships in 
 Long U17 winners:  Ivan Kostin (b) /  Mariia Vorobeva (g)
 Middle U17 winners:  Mikhail Beliakov (b) /  Iuliia Khrennikova (g)
 Sprint U17 winners:  Niklas Ekström (b) /  Nina Karna (g)
 Relay U17 winners:  (Seeti Salonen, Akseli Virtanen, Niklas Ekström) (b) /  1 (Valeria Saranina, Zoya Chernykh, Iuliia Khrennikova) (g)
 March 20 – 24: Junior World Ski Orienteering Championships in 
 Long U20 winners:  Sergey Mizonov (m) /  Marina Vyatkina (f)
 Middle U20 winners:  Jørgen Baklid (m) /  Aleksandra Rusakova (f)
 Sprint U20 winners:  Nicola Mueller (m) /  Sofia Westin (f)
 Relay U20 winners:  1 (Artemiy Dorma, German Sazykin, Sergey Mizonov) (m) /  1 (Marina Vyatkina, Olesia Riazanova, Aleksandra Rusakova) (f)
 March 20 – 24: World Ski Orienteering Championships in 
 Long winners:  Andrey Lamov (m) /  Tove Alexandersson (f)
 Middle winners:  Erik Rost (m) /  Maria Kechkina (f)
 Sprint winners:  Erik Rost &  Sergey Gorlanov (m) /  Tove Alexandersson (f)
 Relay winners:  (Vladislav Kiselev, Sergey Gorlanov, Andrey Lamov) (m) /  (Alena Trapeznikova, Tatyana Oborina, Mariya Kechkina) (f)
 March 21 – 24: World Masters Ski Orienteering Championships in 
 For Long Results here.
 For Middle 1 Results here.
 For Middle 2 Results here.

2019 TrailO World Cup events
 No World Cup events this year scheduled.

World and Continental TrailO-orienteering events
 June 23 – 29: World Trail Orienteering Championships 2019 in  Idanha-a-Nova
 For detailed results, click here
 November 29 – December 2: Asian Trail Orienteering Championships 2019 in

Pickleball
 Representing the first professional tours for the sport of pickleball, two independent professional pickleball tours were established, the Association of Pickleball Professionals (APP) and the Professional Pickleball Association (PPA).
 July 12: Bainbridge Cup played in Essen, Germany. Played concurrently with the German Open Pickleball Championships
 November 2 – 10: 2019 Margaritaville USA Pickleball National Championships in Indian Wells, California

Racquetball

Roller sport

CERH
 October 20, 2018 – 12 May: 2018–19 Rink Hockey Euroleague
 In the final,  Sporting CP defeated  Porto, 5–2, to win their 2nd title.
 October 20, 2018 – April 28: 2018–19 World Skate Europe Cup
 In the final,  Lleida Llista Blava defeated  Sarzana, 6–3, to win their 2nd consecutive title.
 November 10, 2018 – March 17: 2018–19 Rink Hockey European Female League
 In the final,  Voltregà defeated  Palau de Plegamans, 2–1 , to win a 6th record title.

World Skate Europe Artistic skating
 May 2 – 4: European Show & Precision Championships in  Reggio Emilia
 Junior Long winners:  Reus Deportiu
 Precision Junior winners:  Milor
 Small Groups Long winners:  Roma Roller
 Youth Quartet Long winners:  Magic Skate
 May 7 – 11: German Cup in  Freiburg
 For detailed results, click here.
 May 22 – 26: Sedmak Bressen Trophy in  Trieste
 For detailed results, click here.
 August 30 – September 7: Cadet & Youth & Junior & Senior European Championships in  Harsefeld
 September 23 – 28: Cup of Europe in 
 October 10 – 13: Interland Trophy in  Basel

World Skate Europe In-Line Hockey
European Inline Cup 2019
 March 29 – 31: #1 in  Gijón
 Winners:  Francisco José Peula Cabello &  Elton de Souza (m) /  Aura Cristina Quintana Herrera &  Mathilde Pedronno (f)
 April 5 – 7: #2 in  Lagos
 Winners:  Diogo Marreiros (m) (both) /  Aura Cristina Quintana Herrera (f) (both)
 April 12 – 14: #3 in  Geisingen
 Winners:  Diogo Marreiros &  Simon Albrecht (m) /  Sandrine Tas (f) (both)
 April 26 – 28: #4 in  Groß-Gerau
 Winners:  Felix Rijhnen &  Jhoan Guzmán bitar (m) /  Sandrine Tas (f) (both)
 May 3 – 5: #5 in  Heerde
 Winners:  Diogo Marreiros &  Jhoan Guzmán bitar (m) /  Francesca Lollobrigida &  Sandrine Tas (f)
 May 17 – 19: #6 in  Gera
 May 30 – June 2: #7 in  Wörgl
 August 6 & 7: #8 in  Santa Maria Nuova
 August 8 – 10: #9 in  Ostend (final)

 Other competitions
 April 11 – 14: In-Line Hockey European League in  Roana
 In the final,  Tigres de Garges defeated  HC Milano Quanta, 2–1.  CPL Valladolid took third place and  Mad Dogs Bratislava took fourth place.
 May 17 – 19: In-Line Hockey Women European League
 In the final,  CPL Valladolid defeated  Les Phénix Ris Orangis, 3–1.  HCR Cent Patins took third place and  Les Owls RH took fourth place.
 August 1 – 4: Men's In-Line Hockey Under-16 & Under-18 Championships

FIRS
 June 30 – July 14: World Roller Games in  Barcelona
  won both gold and overall medal tallies.

Rowing

Rugby league
International competitions
 May 18: 2018–19 Rugby League European Championship C Final in  London
  defeated , 56–26, to win their second Rugby League European Championship C title.
 June 22 – November 9: 2019 Oceania Cup (rugby league)
 Cup (Group A) winner: 
 Shield (Group B) winner: 
 October 2 – 5: 2019 MEA Rugby League Championship in  Lagos
  defeated , 38–10, in the final.  took third place.
 October 26 – November 10: 2019 Rugby League European play-off tournament

Domestic competitions
 January 26 – August 24: ///// 2019 Challenge Cup
 The  Warrington Wolves defeated the  St. Helens, 18–4, to win their ninth Challenge Cup title.
 January 31 – October 12: / Super League XXIV
 The  St Helens R.F.C. defeated the  Salford Red Devils, 23–6, to win their seventh Super League title.
 February 3 – October 5: // 2019 RFL Championship
  Toronto Wolfpack defeated  Featherstone Rovers, 24–6, to win their second consecutive RFL Championship title.
 February 17 –: / 2019 RFL League 1
 Champions:  Whitehaven
 February 17: 2019 World Club Challenge in  Wigan
  Sydney Roosters defeated  Wigan Warriors, 20–8, to win their third World Club Challenge title.
 March 9 – September 29: / 2019 Intrust Super Cup QLD season
 Burleigh Bears defeated Wynnum Manly Seagulls, 28–10, to win their fourth Queensland Cup title.
 March 14 – October 6: / 2019 NRL season
  Sydney Roosters defeated  Canberra Raiders, 14–8, to win their second consecutive and fourth overall National Rugby League title.
 March 15 – September 29: / 2019 Canterbury Cup NSW
  Newtown Jets defeated  Wentworthville Magpies, 20–15, to win their eighth Canterbury Cup NSW title.
 April 7 – October 13:  2019 RFL Women's Super League
 The  Leeds Rhinos defeated the  Castleford Tigers, 20–12, to win their first RFL Women's Super League title.
 May 4 – July 27:  2019 RFL Women's Challenge Cup
 The Leeds Rhinos defeated the Castleford Tigers, 16–10, to win their second RFL Women's Challenge Cup.

Rugby League Nines
 October 18 & 19: 2019 Rugby League World Cup 9s for Men & Women in  Sydney (debut events)
 Men:  defeated , 24–10, to win the inaugural Men's Rugby League World Cup 9s title.
 Women:  defeated , 17–15, to win the inaugural Women's Rugby League World Cup 9s title.

Rugby sevens

Rugby union

Sailing

Shooting sports

World and continental shooting events
 March 16 – 25: 2019 10m European Shooting Championships in  Osijek
 Rifle
 10 m Air Rifle winners:  Vladimir Maslennikov (m) /  Laura-Georgeta Coman (f)
 10 m Mixed Air Rifle winners:  (Anastasiia Galashina & Vladimir Maslennikov)
 10 m Air Rifle Team winners:  (m) /  (f)
 10 m Junior Air Rifle winners:  Filip Nepejchal (m) /  Stephanie Laura Scurrah Grundsoee (f)
 10 m Junior Mixed Air Rifle winners:  (Tatiana Kharkova & Grigorii Shamakov)
 10 m Junior Air Rifle Team winners:  (m) /  (f)
 Pistol
 10 m Air Pistol winners:  Pavlo Korostylov (m) /  Klaudia Breś (f)
 10 m Mixed Air Pistol winners:  (Olena Kostevych & Oleh Omelchuk)
 10 m Air Pistol Team winners:  (m) /  (f)
 10 m Junior Air Pistol winners:  Anton Aristarkhov (m) /  Sevval Ilayda Tarhan (f)
 10 m Junior Mixed Air Pistol winners:  (Yana Chuchmarova & Ihor Solovei)
 10 m Junior Air Pistol Team winners:  (m) /  (f)
 Running Target
 10 m Running Target winners:  Vladislav Prianishnikov (m) /  Julia Eydenzon (f)
 10 m Mixed Running Target Individual winners:  Krister Holmberg (m) /  Halyna Avramenko (f)
 10 m Mixed Running Target Team winners:  (m) /  (f)
 10 m Mixed Running Target winners:  (Maxim Stepanov & Olga Stepanova)
 10 m Junior Running Target winners:  Aaro Juhani Vuorimaa (m) /  Klaudia Palanki (f)
 10 m Junior Mixed Running Target winners:  Danylo Danilenko (m) /  Klaudia Palanki (f)
 March 25 – April 2: 12th Asian Airgun Championship in  Taoyuan
 Rifle
 10 m Air Rifle winners:  Divyansh Singh Panwar (m) /  Elavenil Valarivan (f)
 Junior 10 m Air Rifle winners:  Yash Vardhan (m) /  Shreya Agrawal (f)
 10 m Junior Mixed Air Rifle winners:  (Shreya Agrawal & Yash Vardhan)
 Teams 10 m Air Rifle winners:  (f)
 10 m Junior Air Rifle Team winners:  (m) /  (f)
 Pistol
 10 m Air Pistol winners:  Mose Kim (m) /  Manu Bhaker (f)
 10 m Junior Air Pistol winners:  Sarabjot Singh (m) /  Esha Singh (f)
 10 m Mixed Air Pistol winners:  (Park Sunmin & Minki Shin)
 10 m Junior Mixed Air Pistol winners:  (Esha Singh & Vijayveer Sidhu)
 Women's 10 m Air Pistol Team winners: 
 10 m Junior Air Pistol Team winners:  (m) /  (f)
 June 30 – July 11: 2019 World Shotgun Championships in  Lonato del Garda
 Skeet winners:  Tomas Nydrle (m) /  Diana Bacosi (f)
 Mixed Team Skeet winners:  (Gabriele Rossetti & Diana Bacosi)
 Trap winners:  Matthew Coward-Holley (m) /  Ashley Carroll (f)
 Double Trap winners:  Antonino Barillà (m) /  Claudia de Luca (f)
 Mixed Team Trap winners:  (Laetisha Scanlan & James Willett)
 Junior Skeet winners:  Daniel Korcak (m) /  Zilia Batyrshina (f)
 Junior Mixed Team Skeet winners:  (Alexander Joseph Ahlin & Austen Smith)
 Junior Trap winners:  Leonardo Lustoza (m) /  Selin Ali (f)
 Men's Junior Double Trap winners:  Marco Carli
 Junior Mixed Team Trap winners:  (Zina Hrdlickova & Fabio Beccari)
 August 3 – 10: 2019 IPSC Rifle World Shoot in   Karlskoga, Sweden
 Open winners:  Jarkko Laukia (m) /  Ashley Rheuark (f)
 Standard winner:  Sami Hautamäki
 Manual Open winner:  Jiro Nihei
 Manual Standard winner:  Vladimir Chamyan
 November 1 – 9: 2019 Oceania Shooting Championship in  Sydney
 November 3 – 11: 2019 Asian Shooting Championship in  Doha
 November 17 – 25: 2019 African Shooting Championship in  Tipasa

2019 ISSF World Cup
 February 20 – 28: Rifle and Pistol World Cup #1 in  New Delhi
 10m Air Pistol winners:  Saurabh Chaudhary (m) /  Veronika Major (f)
 10m Air Pistol Mixed Team winners:  (Manu Bhaker & Saurabh Chaudhary)
 10m Air Rifle winners:  Sergey Kamenskiy (m) /  Apurvi Chandela (f)
 10m Air Rifle Mixed Team winners:  (Zhao Ruozhu & LIU Yukun)
 Men's 25m Rapid Fire Pistol winner:  Christian Reitz
 Women's 25m Pistol winner:  Veronika Major
 50m Rifle Three Positions winners:  Istvan Peni (m) /  Nina Christen (f)
 March 15 – 26: Shotgun World Cup #1 in  Acapulco
 Trap winners:  James Willett (m) /  Jessica Rossi (f)
 Trap Mixed Team winners:  (Laetisha Scanlan & James Willett)
 Skeet winners:  Vincent Hancock (m) /  Kim Rhode (f)
 April 5 – 16: Shotgun World Cup #2 in  Al Ain
 Trap winners:  Josip Glasnović (m) /  Carole Cormenier (f)
 Trap Mixed Team winners:  (Katrin Quooss & Paul Pigorsch)
 Skeet winners:  Mansour Al-Rashidi (m) /  Kim Rhode (f)
 April 21 – 29: Rifle and Pistol World Cup #2 in  Beijing
 10m Air Pistol winners:  Abhishek Verma (m) /  Kim Min-jung (f)
 10m Air Pistol Mixed Team winners:  (Manu Bhaker & Saurabh Chaudhary)
 10m Air Rifle winners:  Hui Zicheng (m) /  Yulia Karimova (f)
 10m Air Rifle Mixed Team winners:  (Anjum Moudgil & Divyansh Singh Panwar)
 Men's 25m Rapid Fire Pistol winner:  Lin Junmin
 Women's 25m Pistol winner:  Maria Grozdeva
 50m Rifle Three Positions winners:  Filip Nepejchal (m) /  Snježana Pejčić (f)
 May 7 – 18: Shotgun World Cup #3 in  Changwon
 Trap winners:  Andreas Makri (m) /  DENG Weiyun (f)
 Trap Mixed Team winners:  (Silvana Stanco & Daniele Resca)
 Skeet winners:  Vincent Hancock (m) /  Kim Rhode (f)
 May 24 – 31: Rifle and Pistol World Cup #3 in  Munich
 10m Air Pistol winners:  Saurabh Chaudhary (m) /  Anna Korakaki (f)
 10m Air Pistol Mixed Team winners:  (Manu Bhaker & Saurabh Chaudhary)
 10m Air Rifle winners:  Filip Nepejchal (m) /  Apurvi Chandela (f)
 10m Air Rifle Mixed Team winners:  (Anjum Moudgil & Divyansh Singh Panwar)
 Men's 25m Rapid Fire Pistol winner:  Lin Junmin
 Women's 25m Pistol winner:  Rahi Sarnobat
 50m Rifle Three Positions winners:  Zhao Zhonghao (m) /  Yulia Zykova (f)
 July 12 – 20: Junior World Cup (All Guns) in  Suhl
 Junior 10m Air Pistol winners:  Sarabjot Singh (m) /  Sevval Ilayda Tarhan (f)
 Junior 10m Air Pistol Mixed Team winners:  (Andrea Katharina Heckner & Robin Walter)
 Junior 25m Pistol winners:  XIA Qi (m) /  Miroslava Mincheva (f)
 Junior Men's 25m Rapid Fire Pistol winner:  Anish Anish
 Junior 25m Standard Pistol winners:  Udhayveer Sidhu (m) /  Chawisa Paduka (f)
 Junior 50m Pistol winners:  Gaurav Rana (m) /  Nadezhda Koloda (f)
 Junior 10m Air Rifle winners:  Grigorii Shamakov (m) /  Elavenil Valarivan (f)
 Junior 10m Air Rifle Mixed Team winners:  (Armina Sadeghian & Amirsiyavash Zolfagharian)
 Junior 50m Rifle Prone winners:  Stefan Wadlegger (m) /  Jeanette Hegg Duestad (f)
 Junior 50m Rifle Three Positions winners:  Aishwary Pratap Singh Tomar (m) /  Anna Janssen (f)
 Junior Skeet winners:  Conner Lynn Prince (m) /  Austen Jewell Smith (f)
 Junior Trap winners:  Lorenzo Ferrari (m) /  Faith Alexa Pendergrass (f)
 Junior Trap Mixed Team winners:  (ZHANG Ting & LI Siwei)
 August 13 – 23: Shotgun World Cup #4 in  Lahti
 Trap winners:  Aleksey Alipov (m) /  Penny Smith (f)
 Trap Mixed Team winners:  (Alessandra Perilli & Gian Marco Berti)
 Skeet winners:  Luigi Lodde (m) /  Wei Meng (f)
 August 26 – September 3: Rifle and Pistol World Cup #4 in  Rio de Janeiro
 10m Air Pistol winners:  Abhishek Verma (m) /  Yashaswini Singh Deswal (f)
 10m Air Pistol Mixed Team winners:  (Manu Bhaker & Saurabh Chaudhary)
 10m Air Rifle winners:  Yu Haonan (m) /  Elavenil Valarivan (f)
 10m Air Rifle Mixed Team winners:  (Apurvi Chandela & Deepak Kumar)
 Men's 25m Rapid Fire Pistol winner:  Christian Reitz
 Women's 25m Pistol winner:  Veronika Major
 50m Rifle Three Positions winners:  Petar Gorša (m) /  Seonaid McIntosh (f)
 October 9 – 14: Shotgun World Cup #5 (final) in  Al Ain
 Skeet winners:  Luigi Lodde (m) /  Wei Meng (f)
 Mixed Skeet winners: 
 Trap winners:  Mauro De Filippis (m) /  Aeriel Skinner (f)
 Mixed Trap winners: 
 November 17 – 24: Rifle and Pistol World Cup #5 (final) in  Putian

Ski jumping

Snooker

Snowboarding

Softball

WBSC (Softball)
 June 13 – 23: 2019 Men's Softball World Championship in  Prague-Havlíčkův Brod
  defeated , 3–2, to win their first Men's Softball World Championship title.
  took third place.
 July 23 – 27: Europe/Africa Softball 2020 Olympic Qualifier in  Utrecht
  defeated , 5–0, to book their team and compete at the 2020 Summer Olympics.
 July 26 – 30: 2019 Women's U12 Softball World Cup in  Tainan (debut event)
  defeated , 3–2, to win the inaugural Women's U12 Softball World Cup title.
 The  took third place.  took fourth place.
 August 10 – 17: 2019 Women's U19 Softball World Cup in  Irvine
 The  defeated , 4–3, to win their third consecutive and seventh overall Women's U19 Softball World Cup title.
  took third place.
 August 25 – September 1: Americas Softball 2020 Olympic Qualifier in  Surrey
 Champions: ; Second: ; Third: 
 Note: Both Mexico and Canada have qualified to compete at the 2020 Summer Olympics.
 September 24 –28: Asia/Oceania Softball 2020 Olympic Qualifier in  Shanghai
 Champions: ; Second: ; Third: 
 Note: Australia has qualified to compete at the 2020 Summer Olympics.

Little League Softball World Series
 July 28 – August 3: 2019 Junior League Softball World Series in  Kirkland at Everest Park
 Team USA Southeast Region ( Interbay (Tampa)) defeated Team USA Southwest Region ( Columbus), 7–6, in the final.
 July 29 – August 4: 2019 Senior League Softball World Series in  Lower Sussex at Lower Sussex Little League Complex
 Team USA Southwest Region ( Waco) defeated Team Delaware D3 Region ( Laurel, Millsboro & Nanticoke Little Leagues), 7–5, in the final.
 August 7 – 14: 2019 Little League Softball World Series in  Portland at Alpenrose Stadium
 Team USA Southeast Region ( Salisbury) defeated Team USA Southwest ( River Ridge), 4–1, in the final.

Speed skating

Sport climbing

Squash

Sumo

Surfing

Table tennis

Taekwondo

Telemark skiing

Tennis

Triathlon

Volleyball

Water polo

Water skiing & Wakeboarding

Weightlifting

Wrestling

2019 Wrestling Continental Championships
 2019 World Wrestling Championships in  Nur-Sultan ⇒ 14–22 September
 2019 European Wrestling Championships in  Bucharest ⇒ 8–14 April
 2019 Asian Wrestling Championships in  Xi'an ⇒ 23–28 April
 2019 Pan American Wrestling Championships in  Buenos Aires ⇒ 19–21 April
 2019 African Wrestling Championships in  Hammamet ⇒ 29–31 March
 Wrestling at the 2019 European Games in  Misnk ⇒ 25–30 June
 Wrestling at the 2019 Pan American Games in  Lima ⇒ 7–10 August 
 Wrestling at the 2019 African Games in  El Jadida ⇒ 28–30 August
 2019 Wrestling World Cup - Men's freestyle in  Yakutsk ⇒ 16–17 March
 2019 Wrestling World Cup - Women's freestyle in  Narita ⇒ 16–17 November 
 2019 U23 World Wrestling Championships in  Budapest ⇒ 28 October–3 November 
 2019 European U23 Wrestling Championship in  Novi Sad ⇒ 4–10 March 
 2019 Asian U23 Wrestling Championship in  Ulaanbaatar ⇒ 21–24 March 
 2019 World Junior Wrestling Championships in  Tallinn ⇒ 12–18 August 
 2019 European Juniors Wrestling Championships in  Pontevedra ⇒ 3–9 June 
 2019 Veterans World Wrestling Championships in  Tbilisi ⇒ 8–13 October 
 Wrestling at the 2019 Military World Games in  Wuhan ⇒ 21–24 October 
 2019 World Beach Wrestling Championships in  Zagreb ⇒ 7–8 September 
 Wrestling at the 2019 European Youth Summer Olympic Festival in  Baku ⇒ 21–23 July 
 2019 World Cadet Wrestling Championships in  Sofia ⇒ 29 July–4 August 
 2019 European Cadets Wrestling Championships in  Faenza ⇒ 17–23 June

Ranking Series
Ranking Series Calendar 2019:
 1st Ranking Series: 24–28 January, Russia, Krasnoyarsk ⇒ Golden Grand Prix Ivan Yarygin 2019 (FS, WW)
 2nd Ranking Series: 9–10 February, Croatia, Zagreb ⇒ 2019 Grand Prix Zagreb Open (GR)
 3rd Ranking Series: 23–24 February, Hungary, Győr ⇒ Hungarian Grand Prix - Polyák Imre Memorial (GR)  
 4th Ranking Series: 28 February-3 March, Bulgaria, Ruse ⇒ 2019 Dan Kolov & Nikola Petrov Tournament (FS,WW,GR) 
 5th Ranking Series: 23–25 May, Italy, Sassari ⇒ Matteo Pellicone Ranking Series 2019 (FS,WW,GR)
 6th Ranking Series: 11–14 July, Turkey, Istanbul ⇒ 2019 Yasar Dogu Tournament (FS, WW)
 7th Ranking Series: 28 February-3 March, Belarus, Minsk ⇒ 2019 Oleg Karavaev Tournament (GR)

2019 Wrestling International tournament
 2019 Vehbi Emre & Hamit Kaplan Tournament in  Istanbul ⇒ 1–3 February
 Grand Prix de France Henri Deglane 2019 in  Nice ⇒ 1–3 February
 2019 Poland Open in  Warsaw ⇒ 2–4 August
 2019 Grand Prix of Germany in  Dortmund ⇒ 3–4 August
 2019 Grand Prix of Spain in  Dortmund ⇒ 5–7 July
 Tbilisi Grand Prix of V. Balavadze and G. Kartozia in  Tbilisi ⇒ 7–11 August
 2019 Grand Prix Moscow Alrosa in  Moscow ⇒ 29–30 November
 2019 Takhti Cup in  Tehran ⇒ 24–28 January
 2019 Klippan Lady Open in  Klippan ⇒ 15–17 February
 2019 Thor Masters in  Nykobing Falster ⇒ 15–16 March
 2019 Mongolia Open in  Ulaanbaatar ⇒ 6–7 April

Wushu

References

 
Sports by year

Sports